

382001–382100 

|-bgcolor=#d6d6d6
| 382001 ||  || — || July 17, 2010 || WISE || WISE || LUT || align=right | 4.8 km || 
|-id=002 bgcolor=#d6d6d6
| 382002 ||  || — || January 29, 2010 || WISE || WISE || LIX || align=right | 4.4 km || 
|-id=003 bgcolor=#d6d6d6
| 382003 ||  || — || July 23, 2010 || WISE || WISE || — || align=right | 3.7 km || 
|-id=004 bgcolor=#C7FF8F
| 382004 ||  || — || September 9, 2010 || La Silla || D. L. Rabinowitz, M. E. Schwamb, S. Tourtellotte || centaur || align=right | 21 km || 
|-id=005 bgcolor=#fefefe
| 382005 ||  || — || October 1, 2010 || Catalina || CSS || H || align=right data-sort-value="0.56" | 560 m || 
|-id=006 bgcolor=#fefefe
| 382006 ||  || — || October 28, 2010 || Mount Lemmon || Mount Lemmon Survey || H || align=right data-sort-value="0.62" | 620 m || 
|-id=007 bgcolor=#fefefe
| 382007 ||  || — || February 1, 2006 || Mount Lemmon || Mount Lemmon Survey || H || align=right data-sort-value="0.71" | 710 m || 
|-id=008 bgcolor=#fefefe
| 382008 ||  || — || February 7, 2008 || Mount Lemmon || Mount Lemmon Survey || — || align=right data-sort-value="0.65" | 650 m || 
|-id=009 bgcolor=#fefefe
| 382009 ||  || — || October 17, 2003 || Kitt Peak || Spacewatch || — || align=right data-sort-value="0.75" | 750 m || 
|-id=010 bgcolor=#fefefe
| 382010 ||  || — || April 15, 2008 || Mount Lemmon || Mount Lemmon Survey || V || align=right data-sort-value="0.73" | 730 m || 
|-id=011 bgcolor=#fefefe
| 382011 ||  || — || February 9, 2008 || Kitt Peak || Spacewatch || — || align=right data-sort-value="0.55" | 550 m || 
|-id=012 bgcolor=#fefefe
| 382012 ||  || — || March 2, 1995 || Kitt Peak || Spacewatch || — || align=right data-sort-value="0.67" | 670 m || 
|-id=013 bgcolor=#fefefe
| 382013 ||  || — || December 17, 2003 || Kitt Peak || Spacewatch || — || align=right | 1.1 km || 
|-id=014 bgcolor=#E9E9E9
| 382014 ||  || — || July 12, 2004 || Reedy Creek || J. Broughton || — || align=right | 1.7 km || 
|-id=015 bgcolor=#fefefe
| 382015 ||  || — || August 29, 2005 || Kitt Peak || Spacewatch || FLO || align=right data-sort-value="0.81" | 810 m || 
|-id=016 bgcolor=#fefefe
| 382016 ||  || — || November 15, 2006 || Kitt Peak || Spacewatch || — || align=right data-sort-value="0.86" | 860 m || 
|-id=017 bgcolor=#fefefe
| 382017 ||  || — || March 28, 2004 || Kitt Peak || Spacewatch || NYS || align=right data-sort-value="0.74" | 740 m || 
|-id=018 bgcolor=#fefefe
| 382018 ||  || — || November 15, 2006 || Kitt Peak || Spacewatch || MAS || align=right data-sort-value="0.59" | 590 m || 
|-id=019 bgcolor=#fefefe
| 382019 ||  || — || December 12, 2006 || Mount Lemmon || Mount Lemmon Survey || NYS || align=right data-sort-value="0.73" | 730 m || 
|-id=020 bgcolor=#fefefe
| 382020 ||  || — || May 9, 2004 || Kitt Peak || Spacewatch || V || align=right data-sort-value="0.76" | 760 m || 
|-id=021 bgcolor=#fefefe
| 382021 ||  || — || March 12, 1996 || Kitt Peak || Spacewatch || SUL || align=right | 2.2 km || 
|-id=022 bgcolor=#fefefe
| 382022 ||  || — || September 14, 1991 || Kitt Peak || Spacewatch || — || align=right data-sort-value="0.90" | 900 m || 
|-id=023 bgcolor=#E9E9E9
| 382023 ||  || — || December 25, 2005 || Kitt Peak || Spacewatch || WAT || align=right | 2.2 km || 
|-id=024 bgcolor=#fefefe
| 382024 ||  || — || March 8, 2008 || Kitt Peak || Spacewatch || — || align=right data-sort-value="0.77" | 770 m || 
|-id=025 bgcolor=#E9E9E9
| 382025 ||  || — || April 6, 1999 || Kitt Peak || Spacewatch || — || align=right data-sort-value="0.96" | 960 m || 
|-id=026 bgcolor=#fefefe
| 382026 ||  || — || June 17, 2005 || Mount Lemmon || Mount Lemmon Survey || — || align=right data-sort-value="0.68" | 680 m || 
|-id=027 bgcolor=#fefefe
| 382027 ||  || — || September 26, 2006 || Kitt Peak || Spacewatch || — || align=right data-sort-value="0.78" | 780 m || 
|-id=028 bgcolor=#fefefe
| 382028 ||  || — || November 18, 2006 || Kitt Peak || Spacewatch || NYS || align=right data-sort-value="0.56" | 560 m || 
|-id=029 bgcolor=#fefefe
| 382029 ||  || — || March 17, 2004 || Kitt Peak || Spacewatch || V || align=right data-sort-value="0.82" | 820 m || 
|-id=030 bgcolor=#fefefe
| 382030 ||  || — || October 4, 2006 || Mount Lemmon || Mount Lemmon Survey || FLO || align=right data-sort-value="0.68" | 680 m || 
|-id=031 bgcolor=#fefefe
| 382031 ||  || — || October 13, 2006 || Kitt Peak || Spacewatch || FLO || align=right data-sort-value="0.57" | 570 m || 
|-id=032 bgcolor=#fefefe
| 382032 ||  || — || April 5, 2000 || Kitt Peak || Spacewatch || — || align=right data-sort-value="0.74" | 740 m || 
|-id=033 bgcolor=#fefefe
| 382033 ||  || — || December 13, 2006 || Kitt Peak || Spacewatch || — || align=right | 1.4 km || 
|-id=034 bgcolor=#fefefe
| 382034 ||  || — || February 29, 2000 || Socorro || LINEAR || MAS || align=right data-sort-value="0.70" | 700 m || 
|-id=035 bgcolor=#fefefe
| 382035 ||  || — || July 7, 2005 || Mauna Kea || C. Veillet || NYS || align=right data-sort-value="0.72" | 720 m || 
|-id=036 bgcolor=#fefefe
| 382036 ||  || — || November 11, 2006 || Mount Lemmon || Mount Lemmon Survey || FLO || align=right data-sort-value="0.66" | 660 m || 
|-id=037 bgcolor=#fefefe
| 382037 ||  || — || September 27, 2006 || Kitt Peak || Spacewatch || — || align=right data-sort-value="0.68" | 680 m || 
|-id=038 bgcolor=#fefefe
| 382038 ||  || — || November 13, 2006 || Kitt Peak || Spacewatch || FLO || align=right data-sort-value="0.59" | 590 m || 
|-id=039 bgcolor=#fefefe
| 382039 ||  || — || October 2, 2006 || Mount Lemmon || Mount Lemmon Survey || — || align=right data-sort-value="0.82" | 820 m || 
|-id=040 bgcolor=#fefefe
| 382040 ||  || — || December 12, 2006 || Kitt Peak || Spacewatch || MAS || align=right data-sort-value="0.59" | 590 m || 
|-id=041 bgcolor=#fefefe
| 382041 ||  || — || April 5, 2000 || Socorro || LINEAR || NYS || align=right data-sort-value="0.81" | 810 m || 
|-id=042 bgcolor=#fefefe
| 382042 ||  || — || November 20, 2003 || Kitt Peak || Spacewatch || — || align=right data-sort-value="0.73" | 730 m || 
|-id=043 bgcolor=#fefefe
| 382043 ||  || — || November 19, 2006 || Kitt Peak || Spacewatch || NYS || align=right data-sort-value="0.70" | 700 m || 
|-id=044 bgcolor=#fefefe
| 382044 ||  || — || November 22, 2006 || Mount Lemmon || Mount Lemmon Survey || — || align=right data-sort-value="0.86" | 860 m || 
|-id=045 bgcolor=#fefefe
| 382045 ||  || — || February 8, 2007 || Kitt Peak || Spacewatch || MAS || align=right data-sort-value="0.82" | 820 m || 
|-id=046 bgcolor=#fefefe
| 382046 ||  || — || December 17, 2006 || Mount Lemmon || Mount Lemmon Survey || NYS || align=right data-sort-value="0.61" | 610 m || 
|-id=047 bgcolor=#fefefe
| 382047 ||  || — || January 29, 2004 || Anderson Mesa || LONEOS || — || align=right data-sort-value="0.89" | 890 m || 
|-id=048 bgcolor=#fefefe
| 382048 ||  || — || March 17, 1996 || Kitt Peak || Spacewatch || NYS || align=right data-sort-value="0.72" | 720 m || 
|-id=049 bgcolor=#E9E9E9
| 382049 ||  || — || March 14, 2007 || Kitt Peak || Spacewatch || — || align=right | 1.4 km || 
|-id=050 bgcolor=#fefefe
| 382050 ||  || — || July 5, 2005 || Mount Lemmon || Mount Lemmon Survey || V || align=right data-sort-value="0.86" | 860 m || 
|-id=051 bgcolor=#E9E9E9
| 382051 ||  || — || March 9, 2007 || Mount Lemmon || Mount Lemmon Survey || — || align=right data-sort-value="0.95" | 950 m || 
|-id=052 bgcolor=#fefefe
| 382052 ||  || — || April 22, 2004 || Kitt Peak || Spacewatch || MAS || align=right data-sort-value="0.78" | 780 m || 
|-id=053 bgcolor=#fefefe
| 382053 ||  || — || March 15, 2004 || Kitt Peak || Spacewatch || NYS || align=right data-sort-value="0.49" | 490 m || 
|-id=054 bgcolor=#fefefe
| 382054 ||  || — || April 11, 2008 || Kitt Peak || Spacewatch || — || align=right data-sort-value="0.75" | 750 m || 
|-id=055 bgcolor=#fefefe
| 382055 ||  || — || March 3, 2000 || Socorro || LINEAR || NYS || align=right data-sort-value="0.69" | 690 m || 
|-id=056 bgcolor=#E9E9E9
| 382056 ||  || — || March 4, 2011 || Kitt Peak || Spacewatch || — || align=right | 1.7 km || 
|-id=057 bgcolor=#fefefe
| 382057 ||  || — || February 17, 2004 || Goodricke-Pigott || R. A. Tucker || — || align=right | 1.1 km || 
|-id=058 bgcolor=#fefefe
| 382058 ||  || — || January 28, 2007 || Kitt Peak || Spacewatch || — || align=right | 1.2 km || 
|-id=059 bgcolor=#fefefe
| 382059 ||  || — || April 14, 2004 || Kitt Peak || Spacewatch || — || align=right | 1.1 km || 
|-id=060 bgcolor=#fefefe
| 382060 ||  || — || October 24, 2001 || Kitt Peak || Spacewatch || V || align=right data-sort-value="0.97" | 970 m || 
|-id=061 bgcolor=#fefefe
| 382061 ||  || — || March 4, 2001 || Kitt Peak || Spacewatch || — || align=right data-sort-value="0.73" | 730 m || 
|-id=062 bgcolor=#fefefe
| 382062 ||  || — || September 14, 2009 || Kitt Peak || Spacewatch || — || align=right data-sort-value="0.76" | 760 m || 
|-id=063 bgcolor=#d6d6d6
| 382063 ||  || — || November 24, 2008 || Kitt Peak || Spacewatch || HYG || align=right | 3.2 km || 
|-id=064 bgcolor=#fefefe
| 382064 ||  || — || March 15, 2004 || Kitt Peak || Spacewatch || NYS || align=right data-sort-value="0.70" | 700 m || 
|-id=065 bgcolor=#E9E9E9
| 382065 ||  || — || February 8, 2002 || Kitt Peak || Spacewatch || — || align=right | 1.7 km || 
|-id=066 bgcolor=#E9E9E9
| 382066 ||  || — || January 30, 2011 || Kitt Peak || Spacewatch || — || align=right | 3.4 km || 
|-id=067 bgcolor=#fefefe
| 382067 ||  || — || October 12, 2005 || Kitt Peak || Spacewatch || — || align=right data-sort-value="0.97" | 970 m || 
|-id=068 bgcolor=#fefefe
| 382068 ||  || — || April 14, 2004 || Kitt Peak || Spacewatch || — || align=right | 1.0 km || 
|-id=069 bgcolor=#fefefe
| 382069 ||  || — || December 21, 2006 || Kitt Peak || Spacewatch || — || align=right data-sort-value="0.89" | 890 m || 
|-id=070 bgcolor=#d6d6d6
| 382070 ||  || — || February 27, 2006 || Kitt Peak || Spacewatch || — || align=right | 2.4 km || 
|-id=071 bgcolor=#fefefe
| 382071 ||  || — || October 1, 2005 || Mount Lemmon || Mount Lemmon Survey || MAS || align=right data-sort-value="0.87" | 870 m || 
|-id=072 bgcolor=#fefefe
| 382072 ||  || — || November 18, 1998 || La Palma || A. Fitzsimmons || — || align=right data-sort-value="0.96" | 960 m || 
|-id=073 bgcolor=#fefefe
| 382073 ||  || — || October 22, 2009 || Mount Lemmon || Mount Lemmon Survey || MAS || align=right data-sort-value="0.78" | 780 m || 
|-id=074 bgcolor=#E9E9E9
| 382074 ||  || — || November 6, 2005 || Mount Lemmon || Mount Lemmon Survey || — || align=right data-sort-value="0.95" | 950 m || 
|-id=075 bgcolor=#d6d6d6
| 382075 ||  || — || May 6, 2006 || Mount Lemmon || Mount Lemmon Survey || — || align=right | 3.2 km || 
|-id=076 bgcolor=#fefefe
| 382076 ||  || — || January 10, 2007 || Mount Lemmon || Mount Lemmon Survey || NYS || align=right data-sort-value="0.84" | 840 m || 
|-id=077 bgcolor=#E9E9E9
| 382077 ||  || — || March 14, 2011 || Catalina || CSS || HNS || align=right | 1.5 km || 
|-id=078 bgcolor=#d6d6d6
| 382078 ||  || — || December 14, 2010 || Kitt Peak || Spacewatch || BRA || align=right | 2.3 km || 
|-id=079 bgcolor=#E9E9E9
| 382079 ||  || — || January 29, 2007 || Kitt Peak || Spacewatch || — || align=right | 1.2 km || 
|-id=080 bgcolor=#E9E9E9
| 382080 ||  || — || August 23, 2008 || Kitt Peak || Spacewatch || — || align=right | 2.0 km || 
|-id=081 bgcolor=#fefefe
| 382081 ||  || — || January 25, 2007 || Kitt Peak || Spacewatch || MAS || align=right data-sort-value="0.84" | 840 m || 
|-id=082 bgcolor=#E9E9E9
| 382082 ||  || — || December 1, 2005 || Kitt Peak || Spacewatch || — || align=right | 1.3 km || 
|-id=083 bgcolor=#fefefe
| 382083 ||  || — || February 22, 2011 || Kitt Peak || Spacewatch || MAS || align=right data-sort-value="0.66" | 660 m || 
|-id=084 bgcolor=#d6d6d6
| 382084 ||  || — || October 6, 2008 || Mount Lemmon || Mount Lemmon Survey || — || align=right | 3.3 km || 
|-id=085 bgcolor=#E9E9E9
| 382085 ||  || — || November 5, 2005 || Kitt Peak || Spacewatch || — || align=right data-sort-value="0.82" | 820 m || 
|-id=086 bgcolor=#fefefe
| 382086 ||  || — || March 18, 2004 || Kitt Peak || Spacewatch || — || align=right data-sort-value="0.78" | 780 m || 
|-id=087 bgcolor=#fefefe
| 382087 ||  || — || January 3, 2000 || Kitt Peak || Spacewatch || — || align=right data-sort-value="0.73" | 730 m || 
|-id=088 bgcolor=#E9E9E9
| 382088 ||  || — || October 26, 2005 || Kitt Peak || Spacewatch || — || align=right data-sort-value="0.96" | 960 m || 
|-id=089 bgcolor=#d6d6d6
| 382089 ||  || — || March 2, 2011 || Kitt Peak || Spacewatch || EOS || align=right | 1.9 km || 
|-id=090 bgcolor=#E9E9E9
| 382090 ||  || — || February 25, 2007 || Kitt Peak || Spacewatch || BAR || align=right | 1.8 km || 
|-id=091 bgcolor=#E9E9E9
| 382091 ||  || — || December 16, 2009 || Mount Lemmon || Mount Lemmon Survey || WIT || align=right | 1.1 km || 
|-id=092 bgcolor=#E9E9E9
| 382092 ||  || — || April 17, 2007 || Catalina || CSS || — || align=right | 3.9 km || 
|-id=093 bgcolor=#E9E9E9
| 382093 ||  || — || May 12, 2007 || Mount Lemmon || Mount Lemmon Survey || MAR || align=right data-sort-value="0.88" | 880 m || 
|-id=094 bgcolor=#E9E9E9
| 382094 ||  || — || January 30, 2006 || Kitt Peak || Spacewatch || MRX || align=right | 1.2 km || 
|-id=095 bgcolor=#E9E9E9
| 382095 ||  || — || March 6, 2011 || Mount Lemmon || Mount Lemmon Survey || — || align=right | 1.2 km || 
|-id=096 bgcolor=#E9E9E9
| 382096 ||  || — || October 9, 2004 || Kitt Peak || Spacewatch || — || align=right | 1.7 km || 
|-id=097 bgcolor=#d6d6d6
| 382097 ||  || — || October 6, 2008 || Mount Lemmon || Mount Lemmon Survey || EUP || align=right | 3.6 km || 
|-id=098 bgcolor=#E9E9E9
| 382098 ||  || — || April 25, 2003 || Kitt Peak || Spacewatch || — || align=right | 1.1 km || 
|-id=099 bgcolor=#E9E9E9
| 382099 ||  || — || October 4, 2004 || Kitt Peak || Spacewatch || — || align=right | 1.3 km || 
|-id=100 bgcolor=#E9E9E9
| 382100 ||  || — || March 11, 2007 || Kitt Peak || Spacewatch || — || align=right | 1.3 km || 
|}

382101–382200 

|-bgcolor=#E9E9E9
| 382101 ||  || — || January 15, 2007 || Kitt Peak || Spacewatch || — || align=right | 1.8 km || 
|-id=102 bgcolor=#E9E9E9
| 382102 ||  || — || November 10, 2009 || Kitt Peak || Spacewatch || — || align=right | 1.1 km || 
|-id=103 bgcolor=#fefefe
| 382103 ||  || — || October 1, 2005 || Mount Lemmon || Mount Lemmon Survey || — || align=right data-sort-value="0.81" | 810 m || 
|-id=104 bgcolor=#E9E9E9
| 382104 ||  || — || November 20, 2009 || Mount Lemmon || Mount Lemmon Survey || — || align=right | 1.4 km || 
|-id=105 bgcolor=#d6d6d6
| 382105 ||  || — || October 9, 2007 || Mount Lemmon || Mount Lemmon Survey || — || align=right | 2.7 km || 
|-id=106 bgcolor=#d6d6d6
| 382106 ||  || — || October 10, 2007 || Catalina || CSS || — || align=right | 3.7 km || 
|-id=107 bgcolor=#E9E9E9
| 382107 ||  || — || April 24, 2007 || Kitt Peak || Spacewatch || — || align=right | 1.8 km || 
|-id=108 bgcolor=#E9E9E9
| 382108 ||  || — || November 20, 2009 || Kitt Peak || Spacewatch || — || align=right data-sort-value="0.99" | 990 m || 
|-id=109 bgcolor=#E9E9E9
| 382109 ||  || — || October 14, 2004 || Kitt Peak || Spacewatch || — || align=right | 1.8 km || 
|-id=110 bgcolor=#fefefe
| 382110 ||  || — || November 16, 2009 || Mount Lemmon || Mount Lemmon Survey || — || align=right | 1.0 km || 
|-id=111 bgcolor=#E9E9E9
| 382111 ||  || — || April 11, 2007 || Kitt Peak || Spacewatch || — || align=right | 1.3 km || 
|-id=112 bgcolor=#E9E9E9
| 382112 ||  || — || November 3, 2008 || Mount Lemmon || Mount Lemmon Survey || — || align=right | 2.4 km || 
|-id=113 bgcolor=#d6d6d6
| 382113 ||  || — || March 8, 2005 || Catalina || CSS || — || align=right | 4.3 km || 
|-id=114 bgcolor=#d6d6d6
| 382114 ||  || — || October 21, 2007 || Mount Lemmon || Mount Lemmon Survey || HYG || align=right | 2.9 km || 
|-id=115 bgcolor=#E9E9E9
| 382115 ||  || — || April 22, 2007 || Kitt Peak || Spacewatch || BRU || align=right | 3.6 km || 
|-id=116 bgcolor=#E9E9E9
| 382116 ||  || — || October 7, 2008 || Mount Lemmon || Mount Lemmon Survey || — || align=right | 2.3 km || 
|-id=117 bgcolor=#E9E9E9
| 382117 ||  || — || November 20, 2009 || Mount Lemmon || Mount Lemmon Survey || — || align=right data-sort-value="0.88" | 880 m || 
|-id=118 bgcolor=#E9E9E9
| 382118 ||  || — || December 21, 2000 || Uccle || T. Pauwels || — || align=right | 2.2 km || 
|-id=119 bgcolor=#fefefe
| 382119 ||  || — || February 9, 2007 || Kitt Peak || Spacewatch || NYS || align=right data-sort-value="0.63" | 630 m || 
|-id=120 bgcolor=#d6d6d6
| 382120 ||  || — || March 10, 2005 || Catalina || CSS || — || align=right | 6.0 km || 
|-id=121 bgcolor=#d6d6d6
| 382121 ||  || — || September 14, 2007 || Siding Spring || SSS || — || align=right | 4.4 km || 
|-id=122 bgcolor=#E9E9E9
| 382122 ||  || — || February 25, 2006 || Kitt Peak || Spacewatch || — || align=right | 2.3 km || 
|-id=123 bgcolor=#E9E9E9
| 382123 ||  || — || October 30, 2005 || Mount Lemmon || Mount Lemmon Survey || KON || align=right | 3.4 km || 
|-id=124 bgcolor=#E9E9E9
| 382124 ||  || — || September 22, 2008 || Kitt Peak || Spacewatch || AGN || align=right | 1.5 km || 
|-id=125 bgcolor=#E9E9E9
| 382125 ||  || — || October 6, 2008 || Mount Lemmon || Mount Lemmon Survey || — || align=right | 2.4 km || 
|-id=126 bgcolor=#E9E9E9
| 382126 ||  || — || December 1, 2005 || Kitt Peak || Spacewatch || — || align=right | 2.0 km || 
|-id=127 bgcolor=#E9E9E9
| 382127 ||  || — || November 22, 2009 || Catalina || CSS || — || align=right | 1.0 km || 
|-id=128 bgcolor=#d6d6d6
| 382128 ||  || — || October 29, 2008 || Mount Lemmon || Mount Lemmon Survey || IMH || align=right | 4.1 km || 
|-id=129 bgcolor=#E9E9E9
| 382129 ||  || — || January 30, 2006 || Catalina || CSS || ADE || align=right | 2.3 km || 
|-id=130 bgcolor=#d6d6d6
| 382130 ||  || — || November 1, 2008 || Mount Lemmon || Mount Lemmon Survey || — || align=right | 4.3 km || 
|-id=131 bgcolor=#d6d6d6
| 382131 ||  || — || October 12, 2007 || Catalina || CSS || — || align=right | 4.5 km || 
|-id=132 bgcolor=#E9E9E9
| 382132 ||  || — || January 31, 2006 || Kitt Peak || Spacewatch || — || align=right | 1.3 km || 
|-id=133 bgcolor=#d6d6d6
| 382133 ||  || — || April 2, 2005 || Catalina || CSS || THB || align=right | 3.5 km || 
|-id=134 bgcolor=#E9E9E9
| 382134 ||  || — || November 12, 2005 || Kitt Peak || Spacewatch || HNS || align=right | 1.3 km || 
|-id=135 bgcolor=#d6d6d6
| 382135 ||  || — || November 30, 2008 || Kitt Peak || Spacewatch || — || align=right | 3.4 km || 
|-id=136 bgcolor=#E9E9E9
| 382136 ||  || — || September 24, 2008 || Catalina || CSS || GER || align=right | 2.1 km || 
|-id=137 bgcolor=#E9E9E9
| 382137 ||  || — || September 27, 2008 || Mount Lemmon || Mount Lemmon Survey || MRX || align=right | 1.0 km || 
|-id=138 bgcolor=#d6d6d6
| 382138 ||  || — || February 16, 2010 || Mount Lemmon || Mount Lemmon Survey || HYG || align=right | 3.0 km || 
|-id=139 bgcolor=#E9E9E9
| 382139 ||  || — || October 19, 2000 || Kitt Peak || Spacewatch || — || align=right | 1.2 km || 
|-id=140 bgcolor=#d6d6d6
| 382140 ||  || — || November 18, 2008 || Kitt Peak || Spacewatch || — || align=right | 3.3 km || 
|-id=141 bgcolor=#E9E9E9
| 382141 ||  || — || March 24, 2006 || Siding Spring || SSS || — || align=right | 2.9 km || 
|-id=142 bgcolor=#E9E9E9
| 382142 ||  || — || April 7, 2006 || Catalina || CSS || — || align=right | 2.9 km || 
|-id=143 bgcolor=#d6d6d6
| 382143 ||  || — || May 21, 2011 || Mount Lemmon || Mount Lemmon Survey || — || align=right | 3.1 km || 
|-id=144 bgcolor=#E9E9E9
| 382144 ||  || — || December 4, 2005 || Kitt Peak || Spacewatch || — || align=right data-sort-value="0.91" | 910 m || 
|-id=145 bgcolor=#E9E9E9
| 382145 ||  || — || November 10, 2004 || Kitt Peak || Spacewatch || GEF || align=right | 1.6 km || 
|-id=146 bgcolor=#d6d6d6
| 382146 ||  || — || March 10, 2005 || Kitt Peak || Spacewatch || — || align=right | 2.8 km || 
|-id=147 bgcolor=#d6d6d6
| 382147 ||  || — || May 28, 2010 || WISE || WISE || — || align=right | 3.0 km || 
|-id=148 bgcolor=#d6d6d6
| 382148 ||  || — || March 7, 2005 || Socorro || LINEAR || BRA || align=right | 2.2 km || 
|-id=149 bgcolor=#E9E9E9
| 382149 ||  || — || January 23, 2006 || Mount Lemmon || Mount Lemmon Survey || — || align=right | 2.0 km || 
|-id=150 bgcolor=#C2FFFF
| 382150 ||  || — || July 28, 2011 || Haleakala || Pan-STARRS || L5 || align=right | 7.1 km || 
|-id=151 bgcolor=#C2FFFF
| 382151 ||  || — || April 23, 2010 || WISE || WISE || L5 || align=right | 15 km || 
|-id=152 bgcolor=#d6d6d6
| 382152 ||  || — || February 10, 1996 || Kitt Peak || Spacewatch || — || align=right | 4.6 km || 
|-id=153 bgcolor=#fefefe
| 382153 ||  || — || November 2, 2000 || Socorro || LINEAR || H || align=right data-sort-value="0.69" | 690 m || 
|-id=154 bgcolor=#fefefe
| 382154 ||  || — || April 18, 2005 || Kitt Peak || Spacewatch || — || align=right data-sort-value="0.87" | 870 m || 
|-id=155 bgcolor=#fefefe
| 382155 ||  || — || February 8, 2008 || Kitt Peak || Spacewatch || — || align=right | 1.1 km || 
|-id=156 bgcolor=#E9E9E9
| 382156 ||  || — || February 23, 2012 || Mount Lemmon || Mount Lemmon Survey || TIN || align=right | 1.2 km || 
|-id=157 bgcolor=#fefefe
| 382157 ||  || — || January 18, 2005 || Kitt Peak || Spacewatch || — || align=right data-sort-value="0.86" | 860 m || 
|-id=158 bgcolor=#fefefe
| 382158 ||  || — || September 30, 2003 || Kitt Peak || Spacewatch || — || align=right data-sort-value="0.65" | 650 m || 
|-id=159 bgcolor=#fefefe
| 382159 ||  || — || December 30, 2008 || Catalina || CSS || H || align=right data-sort-value="0.90" | 900 m || 
|-id=160 bgcolor=#fefefe
| 382160 ||  || — || June 3, 2005 || Kitt Peak || Spacewatch || — || align=right data-sort-value="0.87" | 870 m || 
|-id=161 bgcolor=#E9E9E9
| 382161 ||  || — || February 13, 2011 || Mount Lemmon || Mount Lemmon Survey || — || align=right | 2.0 km || 
|-id=162 bgcolor=#fefefe
| 382162 ||  || — || September 16, 2003 || Kitt Peak || Spacewatch || — || align=right data-sort-value="0.69" | 690 m || 
|-id=163 bgcolor=#fefefe
| 382163 ||  || — || January 10, 2008 || Kitt Peak || Spacewatch || FLO || align=right data-sort-value="0.61" | 610 m || 
|-id=164 bgcolor=#fefefe
| 382164 ||  || — || September 15, 2010 || Mount Lemmon || Mount Lemmon Survey || H || align=right data-sort-value="0.55" | 550 m || 
|-id=165 bgcolor=#E9E9E9
| 382165 ||  || — || December 31, 2005 || Kitt Peak || Spacewatch || — || align=right | 1.1 km || 
|-id=166 bgcolor=#fefefe
| 382166 ||  || — || December 6, 2010 || Kitt Peak || Spacewatch || — || align=right data-sort-value="0.73" | 730 m || 
|-id=167 bgcolor=#fefefe
| 382167 ||  || — || October 9, 2010 || Catalina || CSS || H || align=right data-sort-value="0.62" | 620 m || 
|-id=168 bgcolor=#d6d6d6
| 382168 ||  || — || October 29, 2008 || Kitt Peak || Spacewatch || EUP || align=right | 3.6 km || 
|-id=169 bgcolor=#fefefe
| 382169 ||  || — || January 15, 2005 || Kitt Peak || Spacewatch || — || align=right data-sort-value="0.67" | 670 m || 
|-id=170 bgcolor=#fefefe
| 382170 ||  || — || March 4, 2005 || Kitt Peak || Spacewatch || — || align=right data-sort-value="0.82" | 820 m || 
|-id=171 bgcolor=#fefefe
| 382171 ||  || — || November 8, 2010 || Mount Lemmon || Mount Lemmon Survey || — || align=right data-sort-value="0.63" | 630 m || 
|-id=172 bgcolor=#fefefe
| 382172 ||  || — || May 17, 2009 || Calvin-Rehoboth || L. A. Molnar || — || align=right data-sort-value="0.69" | 690 m || 
|-id=173 bgcolor=#fefefe
| 382173 ||  || — || March 17, 2005 || Kitt Peak || Spacewatch || — || align=right data-sort-value="0.75" | 750 m || 
|-id=174 bgcolor=#fefefe
| 382174 ||  || — || March 28, 2012 || Mount Lemmon || Mount Lemmon Survey || — || align=right data-sort-value="0.89" | 890 m || 
|-id=175 bgcolor=#fefefe
| 382175 ||  || — || November 11, 2007 || Mount Lemmon || Mount Lemmon Survey || — || align=right data-sort-value="0.88" | 880 m || 
|-id=176 bgcolor=#E9E9E9
| 382176 ||  || — || August 11, 2004 || Reedy Creek || J. Broughton || — || align=right data-sort-value="0.99" | 990 m || 
|-id=177 bgcolor=#E9E9E9
| 382177 ||  || — || May 6, 2008 || Mount Lemmon || Mount Lemmon Survey || — || align=right | 1.6 km || 
|-id=178 bgcolor=#fefefe
| 382178 ||  || — || October 7, 2002 || Kitt Peak || Spacewatch || — || align=right data-sort-value="0.87" | 870 m || 
|-id=179 bgcolor=#E9E9E9
| 382179 ||  || — || July 30, 2008 || Siding Spring || SSS || — || align=right | 1.9 km || 
|-id=180 bgcolor=#E9E9E9
| 382180 ||  || — || October 27, 2009 || Kitt Peak || Spacewatch || — || align=right data-sort-value="0.73" | 730 m || 
|-id=181 bgcolor=#fefefe
| 382181 ||  || — || July 28, 2009 || Catalina || CSS || PHO || align=right | 1.3 km || 
|-id=182 bgcolor=#fefefe
| 382182 ||  || — || January 17, 2007 || Kitt Peak || Spacewatch || — || align=right data-sort-value="0.91" | 910 m || 
|-id=183 bgcolor=#E9E9E9
| 382183 ||  || — || December 16, 2009 || Mount Lemmon || Mount Lemmon Survey || — || align=right | 1.6 km || 
|-id=184 bgcolor=#E9E9E9
| 382184 ||  || — || July 30, 2000 || Socorro || LINEAR || — || align=right | 1.1 km || 
|-id=185 bgcolor=#FA8072
| 382185 ||  || — || May 18, 2007 || XuYi || PMO NEO || H || align=right data-sort-value="0.83" | 830 m || 
|-id=186 bgcolor=#fefefe
| 382186 ||  || — || March 9, 2002 || Kitt Peak || Spacewatch || — || align=right data-sort-value="0.63" | 630 m || 
|-id=187 bgcolor=#fefefe
| 382187 ||  || — || February 4, 2005 || Mount Lemmon || Mount Lemmon Survey || — || align=right data-sort-value="0.62" | 620 m || 
|-id=188 bgcolor=#E9E9E9
| 382188 ||  || — || November 10, 2004 || Kitt Peak || Spacewatch || DOR || align=right | 2.1 km || 
|-id=189 bgcolor=#fefefe
| 382189 ||  || — || November 4, 2005 || Kitt Peak || Spacewatch || — || align=right | 1.1 km || 
|-id=190 bgcolor=#E9E9E9
| 382190 ||  || — || February 26, 2007 || Mount Lemmon || Mount Lemmon Survey || — || align=right | 2.4 km || 
|-id=191 bgcolor=#d6d6d6
| 382191 ||  || — || September 20, 2007 || Catalina || CSS || Tj (2.99) || align=right | 3.7 km || 
|-id=192 bgcolor=#E9E9E9
| 382192 ||  || — || January 8, 2011 || Mount Lemmon || Mount Lemmon Survey || — || align=right | 1.6 km || 
|-id=193 bgcolor=#fefefe
| 382193 ||  || — || November 21, 2008 || Mount Lemmon || Mount Lemmon Survey || H || align=right data-sort-value="0.70" | 700 m || 
|-id=194 bgcolor=#fefefe
| 382194 ||  || — || November 24, 2006 || Mount Lemmon || Mount Lemmon Survey || V || align=right data-sort-value="0.69" | 690 m || 
|-id=195 bgcolor=#E9E9E9
| 382195 ||  || — || July 11, 2004 || Anderson Mesa || LONEOS || — || align=right | 1.9 km || 
|-id=196 bgcolor=#E9E9E9
| 382196 ||  || — || June 4, 2000 || Socorro || LINEAR || — || align=right | 1.9 km || 
|-id=197 bgcolor=#E9E9E9
| 382197 ||  || — || February 10, 2002 || Socorro || LINEAR || EUN || align=right | 1.8 km || 
|-id=198 bgcolor=#E9E9E9
| 382198 ||  || — || November 10, 2009 || Kitt Peak || Spacewatch || — || align=right | 1.2 km || 
|-id=199 bgcolor=#d6d6d6
| 382199 ||  || — || November 24, 2008 || Kitt Peak || Spacewatch || — || align=right | 3.4 km || 
|-id=200 bgcolor=#E9E9E9
| 382200 ||  || — || March 30, 2011 || Catalina || CSS || — || align=right | 2.8 km || 
|}

382201–382300 

|-bgcolor=#E9E9E9
| 382201 ||  || — || July 13, 2004 || Siding Spring || SSS || MAR || align=right | 1.3 km || 
|-id=202 bgcolor=#E9E9E9
| 382202 ||  || — || September 10, 2007 || Mount Lemmon || Mount Lemmon Survey || AGN || align=right | 1.2 km || 
|-id=203 bgcolor=#d6d6d6
| 382203 ||  || — || June 7, 2010 || WISE || WISE || — || align=right | 4.2 km || 
|-id=204 bgcolor=#d6d6d6
| 382204 ||  || — || September 13, 2007 || Catalina || CSS || — || align=right | 3.6 km || 
|-id=205 bgcolor=#d6d6d6
| 382205 ||  || — || January 30, 2004 || Kitt Peak || Spacewatch || EOS || align=right | 5.3 km || 
|-id=206 bgcolor=#d6d6d6
| 382206 ||  || — || April 10, 2005 || Kitt Peak || Spacewatch || — || align=right | 3.3 km || 
|-id=207 bgcolor=#d6d6d6
| 382207 ||  || — || March 18, 2010 || Mount Lemmon || Mount Lemmon Survey || — || align=right | 3.9 km || 
|-id=208 bgcolor=#d6d6d6
| 382208 ||  || — || December 18, 2004 || Mount Lemmon || Mount Lemmon Survey || — || align=right | 3.5 km || 
|-id=209 bgcolor=#d6d6d6
| 382209 ||  || — || October 16, 2007 || Catalina || CSS || — || align=right | 5.0 km || 
|-id=210 bgcolor=#d6d6d6
| 382210 ||  || — || September 3, 2007 || Catalina || CSS || EOS || align=right | 2.1 km || 
|-id=211 bgcolor=#fefefe
| 382211 ||  || — || February 6, 2007 || Mount Lemmon || Mount Lemmon Survey || — || align=right | 1.0 km || 
|-id=212 bgcolor=#d6d6d6
| 382212 ||  || — || October 14, 2007 || Catalina || CSS || — || align=right | 4.2 km || 
|-id=213 bgcolor=#E9E9E9
| 382213 ||  || — || November 9, 2004 || Catalina || CSS || — || align=right | 2.8 km || 
|-id=214 bgcolor=#E9E9E9
| 382214 ||  || — || January 23, 2006 || Kitt Peak || Spacewatch || — || align=right | 1.7 km || 
|-id=215 bgcolor=#d6d6d6
| 382215 ||  || — || October 11, 2007 || Mount Lemmon || Mount Lemmon Survey || HYG || align=right | 3.2 km || 
|-id=216 bgcolor=#E9E9E9
| 382216 ||  || — || October 24, 2005 || Mauna Kea || A. Boattini || GEF || align=right | 1.3 km || 
|-id=217 bgcolor=#E9E9E9
| 382217 ||  || — || January 26, 2006 || Mount Lemmon || Mount Lemmon Survey || — || align=right | 1.8 km || 
|-id=218 bgcolor=#d6d6d6
| 382218 ||  || — || September 12, 2007 || Kitt Peak || Spacewatch || — || align=right | 3.6 km || 
|-id=219 bgcolor=#d6d6d6
| 382219 ||  || — || March 4, 2005 || Catalina || CSS || — || align=right | 3.3 km || 
|-id=220 bgcolor=#d6d6d6
| 382220 ||  || — || January 1, 2009 || Kitt Peak || Spacewatch || — || align=right | 3.6 km || 
|-id=221 bgcolor=#E9E9E9
| 382221 ||  || — || October 3, 2008 || Kitt Peak || Spacewatch || AST || align=right | 1.9 km || 
|-id=222 bgcolor=#E9E9E9
| 382222 ||  || — || April 25, 2007 || Kitt Peak || Spacewatch || — || align=right data-sort-value="0.89" | 890 m || 
|-id=223 bgcolor=#E9E9E9
| 382223 ||  || — || February 6, 2006 || Mount Lemmon || Mount Lemmon Survey || — || align=right | 3.6 km || 
|-id=224 bgcolor=#C2FFFF
| 382224 ||  || — || January 23, 2006 || Kitt Peak || Spacewatch || L5 || align=right | 11 km || 
|-id=225 bgcolor=#E9E9E9
| 382225 ||  || — || September 16, 2003 || Kitt Peak || Spacewatch || — || align=right | 3.0 km || 
|-id=226 bgcolor=#E9E9E9
| 382226 ||  || — || September 21, 2008 || Mount Lemmon || Mount Lemmon Survey || — || align=right | 2.2 km || 
|-id=227 bgcolor=#d6d6d6
| 382227 ||  || — || January 16, 2004 || Kitt Peak || Spacewatch || — || align=right | 3.5 km || 
|-id=228 bgcolor=#E9E9E9
| 382228 ||  || — || November 7, 2008 || Mount Lemmon || Mount Lemmon Survey || NEM || align=right | 2.3 km || 
|-id=229 bgcolor=#d6d6d6
| 382229 ||  || — || March 8, 2005 || Mount Lemmon || Mount Lemmon Survey || — || align=right | 3.6 km || 
|-id=230 bgcolor=#d6d6d6
| 382230 ||  || — || May 10, 2005 || Mount Lemmon || Mount Lemmon Survey || — || align=right | 3.0 km || 
|-id=231 bgcolor=#d6d6d6
| 382231 ||  || — || October 23, 2003 || Kitt Peak || Spacewatch || — || align=right | 2.3 km || 
|-id=232 bgcolor=#d6d6d6
| 382232 ||  || — || January 19, 2004 || Kitt Peak || Spacewatch || — || align=right | 4.4 km || 
|-id=233 bgcolor=#E9E9E9
| 382233 ||  || — || March 24, 2006 || Mount Lemmon || Mount Lemmon Survey || AGN || align=right | 1.2 km || 
|-id=234 bgcolor=#d6d6d6
| 382234 ||  || — || September 20, 2001 || Socorro || LINEAR || — || align=right | 3.6 km || 
|-id=235 bgcolor=#d6d6d6
| 382235 ||  || — || October 13, 2007 || Anderson Mesa || LONEOS || — || align=right | 4.9 km || 
|-id=236 bgcolor=#d6d6d6
| 382236 ||  || — || October 7, 2007 || Kitt Peak || Spacewatch || — || align=right | 3.1 km || 
|-id=237 bgcolor=#d6d6d6
| 382237 ||  || — || April 17, 1996 || Kitt Peak || Spacewatch || KOR || align=right | 1.8 km || 
|-id=238 bgcolor=#C2FFFF
| 382238 Euphemus ||  ||  || July 8, 2011 || Mayhill-ISON || L. Elenin || L5 || align=right | 12 km || 
|-id=239 bgcolor=#E9E9E9
| 382239 ||  || — || March 25, 2006 || Mount Lemmon || Mount Lemmon Survey || NEM || align=right | 2.1 km || 
|-id=240 bgcolor=#d6d6d6
| 382240 ||  || — || October 21, 2007 || Mount Lemmon || Mount Lemmon Survey || — || align=right | 4.7 km || 
|-id=241 bgcolor=#d6d6d6
| 382241 ||  || — || March 8, 2005 || Mount Lemmon || Mount Lemmon Survey || 615 || align=right | 1.5 km || 
|-id=242 bgcolor=#d6d6d6
| 382242 ||  || — || September 13, 2007 || Mount Lemmon || Mount Lemmon Survey || — || align=right | 2.9 km || 
|-id=243 bgcolor=#d6d6d6
| 382243 ||  || — || October 10, 2007 || Kitt Peak || Spacewatch || HYG || align=right | 2.7 km || 
|-id=244 bgcolor=#d6d6d6
| 382244 ||  || — || April 22, 2004 || Kitt Peak || Spacewatch || 7:4 || align=right | 3.2 km || 
|-id=245 bgcolor=#d6d6d6
| 382245 ||  || — || August 25, 2001 || Ondřejov || L. Kotková || URS || align=right | 3.1 km || 
|-id=246 bgcolor=#d6d6d6
| 382246 ||  || — || August 19, 2006 || Kitt Peak || Spacewatch || — || align=right | 2.9 km || 
|-id=247 bgcolor=#d6d6d6
| 382247 ||  || — || March 9, 2005 || Kitt Peak || Spacewatch || — || align=right | 3.7 km || 
|-id=248 bgcolor=#C2FFFF
| 382248 ||  || — || October 5, 2012 || Haleakala || Pan-STARRS || L5 || align=right | 8.5 km || 
|-id=249 bgcolor=#E9E9E9
| 382249 ||  || — || November 15, 2003 || Kitt Peak || Spacewatch || AGN || align=right | 2.0 km || 
|-id=250 bgcolor=#d6d6d6
| 382250 ||  || — || March 16, 2004 || Kitt Peak || Spacewatch || — || align=right | 4.1 km || 
|-id=251 bgcolor=#C2FFFF
| 382251 ||  || — || September 22, 2012 || Kitt Peak || Spacewatch || L5 || align=right | 9.2 km || 
|-id=252 bgcolor=#d6d6d6
| 382252 ||  || — || November 19, 2007 || Kitt Peak || Spacewatch || — || align=right | 3.5 km || 
|-id=253 bgcolor=#C2FFFF
| 382253 ||  || — || November 16, 2001 || Kitt Peak || Spacewatch || L5 || align=right | 9.7 km || 
|-id=254 bgcolor=#d6d6d6
| 382254 ||  || — || December 17, 2003 || Kitt Peak || Spacewatch || CHA || align=right | 3.2 km || 
|-id=255 bgcolor=#C2FFFF
| 382255 ||  || — || February 4, 2006 || Kitt Peak || Spacewatch || L5 || align=right | 10 km || 
|-id=256 bgcolor=#E9E9E9
| 382256 ||  || — || October 23, 2003 || Kitt Peak || Spacewatch || — || align=right | 2.4 km || 
|-id=257 bgcolor=#d6d6d6
| 382257 ||  || — || December 16, 2007 || Mount Lemmon || Mount Lemmon Survey || 7:4 || align=right | 3.3 km || 
|-id=258 bgcolor=#d6d6d6
| 382258 ||  || — || December 14, 2001 || Socorro || LINEAR || — || align=right | 4.2 km || 
|-id=259 bgcolor=#C2FFFF
| 382259 ||  || — || August 20, 2011 || Haleakala || Pan-STARRS || L5 || align=right | 8.5 km || 
|-id=260 bgcolor=#d6d6d6
| 382260 ||  || — || October 25, 2005 || Kitt Peak || Spacewatch || 3:2 || align=right | 3.7 km || 
|-id=261 bgcolor=#d6d6d6
| 382261 ||  || — || December 4, 2007 || Catalina || CSS || — || align=right | 4.2 km || 
|-id=262 bgcolor=#d6d6d6
| 382262 ||  || — || January 18, 2005 || La Silla || A. Boattini, H. Scholl || — || align=right | 2.3 km || 
|-id=263 bgcolor=#d6d6d6
| 382263 ||  || — || September 28, 2006 || Mount Lemmon || Mount Lemmon Survey || VER || align=right | 4.1 km || 
|-id=264 bgcolor=#C2FFFF
| 382264 ||  || — || August 29, 2011 || Haleakala || Pan-STARRS || L5 || align=right | 7.3 km || 
|-id=265 bgcolor=#C2FFFF
| 382265 ||  || — || March 2, 2006 || Kitt Peak || Spacewatch || L5 || align=right | 9.4 km || 
|-id=266 bgcolor=#E9E9E9
| 382266 ||  || — || October 13, 2004 || Kitt Peak || Spacewatch || — || align=right | 1.4 km || 
|-id=267 bgcolor=#E9E9E9
| 382267 ||  || — || December 20, 2004 || Mount Lemmon || Mount Lemmon Survey || HOF || align=right | 2.9 km || 
|-id=268 bgcolor=#E9E9E9
| 382268 ||  || — || December 8, 2004 || Socorro || LINEAR || — || align=right | 2.6 km || 
|-id=269 bgcolor=#E9E9E9
| 382269 ||  || — || December 9, 2004 || Kitt Peak || Spacewatch || MIS || align=right | 2.5 km || 
|-id=270 bgcolor=#d6d6d6
| 382270 ||  || — || November 19, 2007 || Kitt Peak || Spacewatch || EOS || align=right | 5.2 km || 
|-id=271 bgcolor=#d6d6d6
| 382271 ||  || — || April 14, 2010 || Catalina || CSS || — || align=right | 2.2 km || 
|-id=272 bgcolor=#d6d6d6
| 382272 ||  || — || May 20, 1999 || Kitt Peak || Spacewatch || LIX || align=right | 2.7 km || 
|-id=273 bgcolor=#d6d6d6
| 382273 ||  || — || December 15, 2001 || Socorro || LINEAR || — || align=right | 4.9 km || 
|-id=274 bgcolor=#d6d6d6
| 382274 ||  || — || April 16, 2004 || Kitt Peak || Spacewatch || — || align=right | 2.7 km || 
|-id=275 bgcolor=#d6d6d6
| 382275 ||  || — || April 13, 2004 || Kitt Peak || Spacewatch || — || align=right | 3.1 km || 
|-id=276 bgcolor=#E9E9E9
| 382276 ||  || — || October 3, 2003 || Kitt Peak || Spacewatch || MRX || align=right | 1.3 km || 
|-id=277 bgcolor=#d6d6d6
| 382277 ||  || — || March 12, 2010 || Kitt Peak || Spacewatch || THM || align=right | 2.6 km || 
|-id=278 bgcolor=#d6d6d6
| 382278 ||  || — || February 13, 2004 || Kitt Peak || Spacewatch || — || align=right | 3.5 km || 
|-id=279 bgcolor=#d6d6d6
| 382279 ||  || — || March 20, 2004 || Socorro || LINEAR || EOS || align=right | 2.4 km || 
|-id=280 bgcolor=#E9E9E9
| 382280 ||  || — || March 2, 2006 || Kitt Peak || Spacewatch || — || align=right | 1.8 km || 
|-id=281 bgcolor=#d6d6d6
| 382281 ||  || — || October 9, 2007 || Mount Lemmon || Mount Lemmon Survey || LIX || align=right | 5.1 km || 
|-id=282 bgcolor=#d6d6d6
| 382282 ||  || — || March 11, 2005 || Mount Lemmon || Mount Lemmon Survey || — || align=right | 3.1 km || 
|-id=283 bgcolor=#fefefe
| 382283 ||  || — || April 14, 2004 || Anderson Mesa || LONEOS || V || align=right data-sort-value="0.89" | 890 m || 
|-id=284 bgcolor=#d6d6d6
| 382284 ||  || — || March 17, 2004 || Kitt Peak || Spacewatch || — || align=right | 2.6 km || 
|-id=285 bgcolor=#E9E9E9
| 382285 ||  || — || October 20, 2003 || Kitt Peak || Spacewatch || — || align=right | 2.4 km || 
|-id=286 bgcolor=#d6d6d6
| 382286 ||  || — || September 24, 2006 || Anderson Mesa || LONEOS || — || align=right | 5.3 km || 
|-id=287 bgcolor=#E9E9E9
| 382287 ||  || — || September 9, 2008 || Catalina || CSS || — || align=right | 1.8 km || 
|-id=288 bgcolor=#d6d6d6
| 382288 ||  || — || December 13, 2007 || Socorro || LINEAR || URS || align=right | 4.8 km || 
|-id=289 bgcolor=#d6d6d6
| 382289 ||  || — || January 17, 2009 || Kitt Peak || Spacewatch || — || align=right | 2.3 km || 
|-id=290 bgcolor=#d6d6d6
| 382290 ||  || — || April 28, 2004 || Kitt Peak || Spacewatch || — || align=right | 3.7 km || 
|-id=291 bgcolor=#C2FFFF
| 382291 ||  || — || May 7, 2010 || WISE || WISE || L5 || align=right | 9.9 km || 
|-id=292 bgcolor=#d6d6d6
| 382292 ||  || — || September 17, 2006 || Catalina || CSS || — || align=right | 7.0 km || 
|-id=293 bgcolor=#d6d6d6
| 382293 ||  || — || November 19, 2007 || Kitt Peak || Spacewatch || — || align=right | 3.2 km || 
|-id=294 bgcolor=#d6d6d6
| 382294 ||  || — || September 12, 2001 || Kitt Peak || Spacewatch || — || align=right | 3.3 km || 
|-id=295 bgcolor=#d6d6d6
| 382295 ||  || — || November 2, 2007 || Mount Lemmon || Mount Lemmon Survey || — || align=right | 3.5 km || 
|-id=296 bgcolor=#E9E9E9
| 382296 ||  || — || September 5, 2007 || Catalina || CSS || — || align=right | 2.9 km || 
|-id=297 bgcolor=#d6d6d6
| 382297 ||  || — || February 22, 2010 || WISE || WISE || — || align=right | 5.8 km || 
|-id=298 bgcolor=#d6d6d6
| 382298 ||  || — || November 11, 2001 || Kitt Peak || Spacewatch || TIR || align=right | 4.0 km || 
|-id=299 bgcolor=#d6d6d6
| 382299 ||  || — || September 19, 2006 || Catalina || CSS || — || align=right | 3.2 km || 
|-id=300 bgcolor=#E9E9E9
| 382300 ||  || — || April 19, 2006 || Kitt Peak || Spacewatch || — || align=right | 1.4 km || 
|}

382301–382400 

|-bgcolor=#d6d6d6
| 382301 ||  || — || August 31, 2000 || Kitt Peak || Spacewatch || ALA || align=right | 4.3 km || 
|-id=302 bgcolor=#d6d6d6
| 382302 ||  || — || September 16, 2006 || Catalina || CSS || — || align=right | 3.4 km || 
|-id=303 bgcolor=#C2FFFF
| 382303 ||  || — || December 23, 2000 || Kitt Peak || Spacewatch || L4 || align=right | 14 km || 
|-id=304 bgcolor=#E9E9E9
| 382304 ||  || — || September 25, 2009 || Catalina || CSS || EUN || align=right | 1.4 km || 
|-id=305 bgcolor=#d6d6d6
| 382305 ||  || — || October 6, 2008 || Mount Lemmon || Mount Lemmon Survey || — || align=right | 3.2 km || 
|-id=306 bgcolor=#d6d6d6
| 382306 ||  || — || September 23, 2008 || Mount Lemmon || Mount Lemmon Survey || — || align=right | 2.7 km || 
|-id=307 bgcolor=#d6d6d6
| 382307 ||  || — || September 21, 2008 || Kitt Peak || Spacewatch || HYG || align=right | 2.8 km || 
|-id=308 bgcolor=#E9E9E9
| 382308 ||  || — || December 15, 2004 || Socorro || LINEAR || — || align=right | 3.2 km || 
|-id=309 bgcolor=#d6d6d6
| 382309 ||  || — || September 27, 2007 || Mount Lemmon || Mount Lemmon Survey || 7:4* || align=right | 4.7 km || 
|-id=310 bgcolor=#d6d6d6
| 382310 ||  || — || December 18, 2004 || Mount Lemmon || Mount Lemmon Survey || — || align=right | 3.9 km || 
|-id=311 bgcolor=#d6d6d6
| 382311 ||  || — || December 25, 1998 || Kitt Peak || Spacewatch || EOS || align=right | 2.2 km || 
|-id=312 bgcolor=#fefefe
| 382312 ||  || — || March 26, 2008 || Mount Lemmon || Mount Lemmon Survey || — || align=right | 1.1 km || 
|-id=313 bgcolor=#E9E9E9
| 382313 ||  || — || October 22, 2009 || Mount Lemmon || Mount Lemmon Survey || — || align=right | 2.1 km || 
|-id=314 bgcolor=#fefefe
| 382314 ||  || — || May 13, 2005 || Mount Lemmon || Mount Lemmon Survey || MAS || align=right data-sort-value="0.81" | 810 m || 
|-id=315 bgcolor=#E9E9E9
| 382315 ||  || — || December 27, 2000 || Kitt Peak || Spacewatch || MRX || align=right | 1.2 km || 
|-id=316 bgcolor=#E9E9E9
| 382316 ||  || — || November 11, 2004 || Kitt Peak || Spacewatch || AGN || align=right | 1.4 km || 
|-id=317 bgcolor=#d6d6d6
| 382317 ||  || — || April 14, 2005 || Kitt Peak || Spacewatch || — || align=right | 3.9 km || 
|-id=318 bgcolor=#fefefe
| 382318 ||  || — || August 28, 2006 || Catalina || CSS || FLO || align=right data-sort-value="0.60" | 600 m || 
|-id=319 bgcolor=#E9E9E9
| 382319 ||  || — || March 10, 2007 || Kitt Peak || Spacewatch || — || align=right | 2.1 km || 
|-id=320 bgcolor=#fefefe
| 382320 ||  || — || November 25, 2006 || Mount Lemmon || Mount Lemmon Survey || — || align=right data-sort-value="0.59" | 590 m || 
|-id=321 bgcolor=#E9E9E9
| 382321 ||  || — || November 11, 2004 || Kitt Peak || Spacewatch || PAD || align=right | 3.9 km || 
|-id=322 bgcolor=#d6d6d6
| 382322 ||  || — || October 8, 2007 || Catalina || CSS || — || align=right | 4.7 km || 
|-id=323 bgcolor=#E9E9E9
| 382323 ||  || — || April 11, 2007 || Kitt Peak || Spacewatch || HNS || align=right | 3.8 km || 
|-id=324 bgcolor=#d6d6d6
| 382324 ||  || — || April 6, 2011 || Mount Lemmon || Mount Lemmon Survey || — || align=right | 2.8 km || 
|-id=325 bgcolor=#d6d6d6
| 382325 ||  || — || September 8, 2007 || Anderson Mesa || LONEOS || EOS || align=right | 2.5 km || 
|-id=326 bgcolor=#E9E9E9
| 382326 ||  || — || October 8, 2004 || Socorro || LINEAR || GEF || align=right | 1.6 km || 
|-id=327 bgcolor=#E9E9E9
| 382327 ||  || — || February 25, 2006 || Kitt Peak || Spacewatch || — || align=right | 2.5 km || 
|-id=328 bgcolor=#d6d6d6
| 382328 ||  || — || April 10, 2005 || Kitt Peak || Spacewatch || URS || align=right | 3.7 km || 
|-id=329 bgcolor=#E9E9E9
| 382329 ||  || — || October 10, 1999 || Socorro || LINEAR || — || align=right | 3.1 km || 
|-id=330 bgcolor=#E9E9E9
| 382330 ||  || — || September 25, 2008 || Mount Lemmon || Mount Lemmon Survey || HOF || align=right | 2.9 km || 
|-id=331 bgcolor=#E9E9E9
| 382331 ||  || — || September 8, 2000 || Kitt Peak || Spacewatch || — || align=right | 1.4 km || 
|-id=332 bgcolor=#E9E9E9
| 382332 ||  || — || September 19, 1995 || Kitt Peak || Spacewatch || — || align=right | 1.9 km || 
|-id=333 bgcolor=#d6d6d6
| 382333 ||  || — || September 12, 2007 || Catalina || CSS || — || align=right | 3.8 km || 
|-id=334 bgcolor=#fefefe
| 382334 ||  || — || November 11, 2006 || Kitt Peak || Spacewatch || MAS || align=right data-sort-value="0.84" | 840 m || 
|-id=335 bgcolor=#E9E9E9
| 382335 ||  || — || November 27, 2009 || Mount Lemmon || Mount Lemmon Survey || — || align=right | 3.0 km || 
|-id=336 bgcolor=#fefefe
| 382336 ||  || — || October 12, 1998 || Kitt Peak || Spacewatch || — || align=right data-sort-value="0.77" | 770 m || 
|-id=337 bgcolor=#E9E9E9
| 382337 ||  || — || February 4, 2011 || Haleakala || Pan-STARRS || — || align=right | 1.8 km || 
|-id=338 bgcolor=#d6d6d6
| 382338 ||  || — || October 13, 1998 || Kitt Peak || Spacewatch || KOR || align=right | 1.2 km || 
|-id=339 bgcolor=#E9E9E9
| 382339 ||  || — || November 19, 2009 || Kitt Peak || Spacewatch || — || align=right | 1.7 km || 
|-id=340 bgcolor=#E9E9E9
| 382340 ||  || — || February 1, 2006 || Mount Lemmon || Mount Lemmon Survey || — || align=right | 2.0 km || 
|-id=341 bgcolor=#fefefe
| 382341 ||  || — || September 20, 2003 || Kitt Peak || Spacewatch || — || align=right | 1.0 km || 
|-id=342 bgcolor=#d6d6d6
| 382342 ||  || — || January 16, 2005 || Kitt Peak || Spacewatch || CHA || align=right | 2.3 km || 
|-id=343 bgcolor=#E9E9E9
| 382343 ||  || — || October 4, 2004 || Kitt Peak || Spacewatch || — || align=right | 2.3 km || 
|-id=344 bgcolor=#d6d6d6
| 382344 ||  || — || April 14, 2004 || Bergisch Gladbach || W. Bickel || — || align=right | 5.3 km || 
|-id=345 bgcolor=#E9E9E9
| 382345 ||  || — || February 20, 2006 || Kitt Peak || Spacewatch || — || align=right | 3.4 km || 
|-id=346 bgcolor=#E9E9E9
| 382346 ||  || — || August 8, 2004 || Socorro || LINEAR || — || align=right | 1.9 km || 
|-id=347 bgcolor=#d6d6d6
| 382347 ||  || — || September 29, 2008 || Mount Lemmon || Mount Lemmon Survey || EOS || align=right | 2.3 km || 
|-id=348 bgcolor=#fefefe
| 382348 ||  || — || September 14, 2006 || Catalina || CSS || — || align=right data-sort-value="0.67" | 670 m || 
|-id=349 bgcolor=#E9E9E9
| 382349 ||  || — || October 9, 2004 || Anderson Mesa || LONEOS || — || align=right | 2.3 km || 
|-id=350 bgcolor=#E9E9E9
| 382350 ||  || — || September 22, 2009 || Mount Lemmon || Mount Lemmon Survey || — || align=right | 3.4 km || 
|-id=351 bgcolor=#d6d6d6
| 382351 ||  || — || September 9, 1996 || Kitt Peak || Spacewatch || — || align=right | 3.5 km || 
|-id=352 bgcolor=#d6d6d6
| 382352 ||  || — || June 14, 2007 || Kitt Peak || Spacewatch || CHA || align=right | 2.1 km || 
|-id=353 bgcolor=#fefefe
| 382353 ||  || — || December 13, 2006 || Kitt Peak || Spacewatch || NYS || align=right data-sort-value="0.81" | 810 m || 
|-id=354 bgcolor=#E9E9E9
| 382354 ||  || — || September 27, 2009 || Kitt Peak || Spacewatch || — || align=right | 1.9 km || 
|-id=355 bgcolor=#d6d6d6
| 382355 ||  || — || April 10, 2005 || Kitt Peak || Spacewatch || — || align=right | 3.4 km || 
|-id=356 bgcolor=#E9E9E9
| 382356 ||  || — || October 4, 2004 || Kitt Peak || Spacewatch || WIT || align=right | 1.1 km || 
|-id=357 bgcolor=#E9E9E9
| 382357 ||  || — || October 7, 2004 || Kitt Peak || Spacewatch || HOF || align=right | 2.8 km || 
|-id=358 bgcolor=#d6d6d6
| 382358 ||  || — || February 16, 2004 || Socorro || LINEAR || HYG || align=right | 3.6 km || 
|-id=359 bgcolor=#E9E9E9
| 382359 ||  || — || February 16, 2001 || Kitt Peak || Spacewatch || AST || align=right | 2.0 km || 
|-id=360 bgcolor=#fefefe
| 382360 ||  || — || September 1, 2003 || Socorro || LINEAR || — || align=right data-sort-value="0.75" | 750 m || 
|-id=361 bgcolor=#fefefe
| 382361 ||  || — || July 5, 2005 || Mount Lemmon || Mount Lemmon Survey || NYS || align=right data-sort-value="0.72" | 720 m || 
|-id=362 bgcolor=#d6d6d6
| 382362 ||  || — || May 22, 2006 || Kitt Peak || Spacewatch || — || align=right | 3.2 km || 
|-id=363 bgcolor=#fefefe
| 382363 ||  || — || August 25, 2003 || Socorro || LINEAR || — || align=right data-sort-value="0.71" | 710 m || 
|-id=364 bgcolor=#d6d6d6
| 382364 ||  || — || October 3, 2008 || Mount Lemmon || Mount Lemmon Survey || — || align=right | 2.9 km || 
|-id=365 bgcolor=#d6d6d6
| 382365 ||  || — || March 3, 2006 || Kitt Peak || Spacewatch || — || align=right | 2.4 km || 
|-id=366 bgcolor=#E9E9E9
| 382366 ||  || — || October 25, 2005 || Catalina || CSS || — || align=right | 1.1 km || 
|-id=367 bgcolor=#fefefe
| 382367 ||  || — || July 23, 1993 || Kitt Peak || Spacewatch || — || align=right data-sort-value="0.97" | 970 m || 
|-id=368 bgcolor=#E9E9E9
| 382368 ||  || — || December 10, 2004 || Kitt Peak || Spacewatch || — || align=right | 2.4 km || 
|-id=369 bgcolor=#fefefe
| 382369 ||  || — || March 31, 2008 || Mount Lemmon || Mount Lemmon Survey || — || align=right data-sort-value="0.87" | 870 m || 
|-id=370 bgcolor=#E9E9E9
| 382370 ||  || — || January 27, 2007 || Mount Lemmon || Mount Lemmon Survey || — || align=right | 1.2 km || 
|-id=371 bgcolor=#E9E9E9
| 382371 ||  || — || February 22, 2006 || Mount Lemmon || Mount Lemmon Survey || GEF || align=right | 1.4 km || 
|-id=372 bgcolor=#E9E9E9
| 382372 ||  || — || October 11, 2004 || Kitt Peak || Spacewatch || WIT || align=right | 1.00 km || 
|-id=373 bgcolor=#E9E9E9
| 382373 ||  || — || January 30, 2011 || Haleakala || Pan-STARRS || AEO || align=right | 1.3 km || 
|-id=374 bgcolor=#fefefe
| 382374 ||  || — || October 20, 2006 || Mount Lemmon || Mount Lemmon Survey || V || align=right data-sort-value="0.72" | 720 m || 
|-id=375 bgcolor=#fefefe
| 382375 ||  || — || January 28, 2007 || Mount Lemmon || Mount Lemmon Survey || MAS || align=right data-sort-value="0.71" | 710 m || 
|-id=376 bgcolor=#E9E9E9
| 382376 ||  || — || September 20, 2009 || Mount Lemmon || Mount Lemmon Survey || — || align=right | 1.7 km || 
|-id=377 bgcolor=#E9E9E9
| 382377 ||  || — || February 2, 1997 || Kitt Peak || Spacewatch || NEM || align=right | 2.7 km || 
|-id=378 bgcolor=#E9E9E9
| 382378 ||  || — || March 24, 2006 || Kitt Peak || Spacewatch || — || align=right | 3.0 km || 
|-id=379 bgcolor=#E9E9E9
| 382379 ||  || — || November 26, 2009 || Catalina || CSS || — || align=right | 2.0 km || 
|-id=380 bgcolor=#E9E9E9
| 382380 ||  || — || November 3, 2000 || Socorro || LINEAR || — || align=right | 1.8 km || 
|-id=381 bgcolor=#fefefe
| 382381 ||  || — || September 28, 2003 || Kitt Peak || Spacewatch || — || align=right data-sort-value="0.65" | 650 m || 
|-id=382 bgcolor=#E9E9E9
| 382382 ||  || — || October 9, 2004 || Kitt Peak || Spacewatch || — || align=right | 1.6 km || 
|-id=383 bgcolor=#d6d6d6
| 382383 ||  || — || April 12, 2005 || Mount Lemmon || Mount Lemmon Survey || — || align=right | 3.6 km || 
|-id=384 bgcolor=#d6d6d6
| 382384 ||  || — || May 7, 2005 || Mount Lemmon || Mount Lemmon Survey || — || align=right | 2.9 km || 
|-id=385 bgcolor=#E9E9E9
| 382385 ||  || — || October 3, 1999 || Kitt Peak || Spacewatch || TIN || align=right | 1.2 km || 
|-id=386 bgcolor=#fefefe
| 382386 ||  || — || June 17, 2005 || Mount Lemmon || Mount Lemmon Survey || NYS || align=right data-sort-value="0.92" | 920 m || 
|-id=387 bgcolor=#d6d6d6
| 382387 ||  || — || February 13, 2004 || Kitt Peak || Spacewatch || — || align=right | 3.7 km || 
|-id=388 bgcolor=#FA8072
| 382388 ||  || — || October 11, 1977 || Palomar || PLS || — || align=right | 1.7 km || 
|-id=389 bgcolor=#d6d6d6
| 382389 ||  || — || December 4, 2008 || Kitt Peak || Spacewatch || HYG || align=right | 4.4 km || 
|-id=390 bgcolor=#fefefe
| 382390 ||  || — || March 30, 2012 || Kitt Peak || Spacewatch || — || align=right | 1.0 km || 
|-id=391 bgcolor=#fefefe
| 382391 ||  || — || September 24, 2000 || Socorro || LINEAR || — || align=right data-sort-value="0.75" | 750 m || 
|-id=392 bgcolor=#d6d6d6
| 382392 ||  || — || December 19, 2003 || Kitt Peak || Spacewatch || THM || align=right | 2.7 km || 
|-id=393 bgcolor=#fefefe
| 382393 ||  || — || January 30, 2009 || Catalina || CSS || H || align=right data-sort-value="0.68" | 680 m || 
|-id=394 bgcolor=#FA8072
| 382394 ||  || — || October 17, 1960 || Palomar || PLS || — || align=right | 1.6 km || 
|-id=395 bgcolor=#FFC2E0
| 382395 || 1990 SM || — || September 22, 1990 || Siding Spring || R. H. McNaught, P. McKenzie || APO +1kmPHA || align=right | 1.8 km || 
|-id=396 bgcolor=#fefefe
| 382396 ||  || — || October 6, 1991 || Palomar || A. Lowe || — || align=right data-sort-value="0.87" | 870 m || 
|-id=397 bgcolor=#E9E9E9
| 382397 ||  || — || November 4, 1991 || Kitt Peak || Spacewatch || — || align=right | 1.7 km || 
|-id=398 bgcolor=#fefefe
| 382398 ||  || — || September 28, 1994 || Kitt Peak || Spacewatch || — || align=right data-sort-value="0.66" | 660 m || 
|-id=399 bgcolor=#E9E9E9
| 382399 ||  || — || September 28, 1994 || Kitt Peak || Spacewatch || — || align=right | 2.1 km || 
|-id=400 bgcolor=#fefefe
| 382400 ||  || — || September 28, 1994 || Kitt Peak || Spacewatch || — || align=right data-sort-value="0.76" | 760 m || 
|}

382401–382500 

|-bgcolor=#fefefe
| 382401 ||  || — || October 26, 1994 || Kitt Peak || Spacewatch || MAS || align=right data-sort-value="0.71" | 710 m || 
|-id=402 bgcolor=#fefefe
| 382402 ||  || — || August 4, 1995 || Haleakala || AMOS || V || align=right | 1.0 km || 
|-id=403 bgcolor=#fefefe
| 382403 ||  || — || September 25, 1995 || Kitt Peak || Spacewatch || MAS || align=right data-sort-value="0.51" | 510 m || 
|-id=404 bgcolor=#d6d6d6
| 382404 ||  || — || September 20, 1995 || Kitt Peak || Spacewatch || THB || align=right | 2.8 km || 
|-id=405 bgcolor=#E9E9E9
| 382405 ||  || — || November 18, 1995 || Kitt Peak || Spacewatch || — || align=right | 1.5 km || 
|-id=406 bgcolor=#FFC2E0
| 382406 ||  || — || January 12, 1996 || Kitt Peak || Spacewatch || APOPHAcritical || align=right data-sort-value="0.30" | 300 m || 
|-id=407 bgcolor=#d6d6d6
| 382407 ||  || — || October 8, 1996 || Prescott || P. G. Comba || — || align=right | 3.8 km || 
|-id=408 bgcolor=#E9E9E9
| 382408 ||  || — || October 7, 1996 || Kitt Peak || Spacewatch || — || align=right | 1.1 km || 
|-id=409 bgcolor=#d6d6d6
| 382409 ||  || — || October 10, 1996 || Kitt Peak || Spacewatch || — || align=right | 2.5 km || 
|-id=410 bgcolor=#d6d6d6
| 382410 ||  || — || November 6, 1996 || Kitt Peak || Spacewatch || THM || align=right | 2.1 km || 
|-id=411 bgcolor=#d6d6d6
| 382411 ||  || — || March 2, 1997 || Kitt Peak || Spacewatch || — || align=right | 3.8 km || 
|-id=412 bgcolor=#fefefe
| 382412 ||  || — || September 25, 1997 || Pianoro || V. Goretti || — || align=right | 1.3 km || 
|-id=413 bgcolor=#fefefe
| 382413 ||  || — || November 23, 1997 || Kitt Peak || Spacewatch || MAS || align=right data-sort-value="0.86" | 860 m || 
|-id=414 bgcolor=#d6d6d6
| 382414 ||  || — || January 29, 1998 || Kitt Peak || Spacewatch || — || align=right | 3.3 km || 
|-id=415 bgcolor=#E9E9E9
| 382415 ||  || — || March 24, 1998 || Socorro || LINEAR || — || align=right | 1.2 km || 
|-id=416 bgcolor=#E9E9E9
| 382416 ||  || — || May 23, 1998 || Kitt Peak || Spacewatch || — || align=right | 1.4 km || 
|-id=417 bgcolor=#fefefe
| 382417 ||  || — || July 26, 1998 || La Silla || E. W. Elst || NYS || align=right data-sort-value="0.88" | 880 m || 
|-id=418 bgcolor=#FA8072
| 382418 ||  || — || August 17, 1998 || Socorro || LINEAR || — || align=right | 1.3 km || 
|-id=419 bgcolor=#fefefe
| 382419 ||  || — || September 13, 1998 || Kitt Peak || Spacewatch || — || align=right data-sort-value="0.70" | 700 m || 
|-id=420 bgcolor=#fefefe
| 382420 ||  || — || September 14, 1998 || Kitt Peak || Spacewatch || MAS || align=right data-sort-value="0.65" | 650 m || 
|-id=421 bgcolor=#fefefe
| 382421 ||  || — || September 30, 1998 || Kitt Peak || Spacewatch || MAS || align=right data-sort-value="0.63" | 630 m || 
|-id=422 bgcolor=#fefefe
| 382422 ||  || — || October 12, 1998 || Kitt Peak || Spacewatch || MAS || align=right data-sort-value="0.72" | 720 m || 
|-id=423 bgcolor=#fefefe
| 382423 ||  || — || October 15, 1998 || Kitt Peak || Spacewatch || NYS || align=right data-sort-value="0.55" | 550 m || 
|-id=424 bgcolor=#fefefe
| 382424 ||  || — || November 10, 1998 || Caussols || ODAS || MAS || align=right data-sort-value="0.75" | 750 m || 
|-id=425 bgcolor=#fefefe
| 382425 ||  || — || December 26, 1998 || Kitt Peak || Spacewatch || — || align=right data-sort-value="0.93" | 930 m || 
|-id=426 bgcolor=#fefefe
| 382426 ||  || — || January 8, 1999 || Kitt Peak || Spacewatch || — || align=right data-sort-value="0.84" | 840 m || 
|-id=427 bgcolor=#d6d6d6
| 382427 ||  || — || February 9, 1999 || Cloudcroft || W. Offutt || — || align=right | 2.0 km || 
|-id=428 bgcolor=#d6d6d6
| 382428 ||  || — || February 12, 1999 || Socorro || LINEAR || — || align=right | 3.4 km || 
|-id=429 bgcolor=#fefefe
| 382429 ||  || — || March 20, 1999 || Apache Point || SDSS || NYS || align=right data-sort-value="0.69" | 690 m || 
|-id=430 bgcolor=#fefefe
| 382430 ||  || — || September 13, 1999 || Socorro || LINEAR || PHO || align=right | 1.2 km || 
|-id=431 bgcolor=#E9E9E9
| 382431 ||  || — || September 8, 1999 || Socorro || LINEAR || — || align=right | 2.8 km || 
|-id=432 bgcolor=#E9E9E9
| 382432 ||  || — || September 9, 1999 || Socorro || LINEAR || — || align=right | 2.4 km || 
|-id=433 bgcolor=#E9E9E9
| 382433 ||  || — || October 4, 1999 || Kitt Peak || Spacewatch || — || align=right | 1.4 km || 
|-id=434 bgcolor=#E9E9E9
| 382434 ||  || — || October 9, 1999 || Kitt Peak || Spacewatch || — || align=right | 1.2 km || 
|-id=435 bgcolor=#fefefe
| 382435 ||  || — || October 4, 1999 || Socorro || LINEAR || — || align=right data-sort-value="0.80" | 800 m || 
|-id=436 bgcolor=#E9E9E9
| 382436 ||  || — || October 12, 1999 || Socorro || LINEAR || CLO || align=right | 2.2 km || 
|-id=437 bgcolor=#E9E9E9
| 382437 ||  || — || October 15, 1999 || Socorro || LINEAR || — || align=right | 3.0 km || 
|-id=438 bgcolor=#FA8072
| 382438 ||  || — || October 3, 1999 || Socorro || LINEAR || — || align=right | 1.1 km || 
|-id=439 bgcolor=#E9E9E9
| 382439 ||  || — || October 9, 1999 || Kitt Peak || Spacewatch || — || align=right | 1.9 km || 
|-id=440 bgcolor=#E9E9E9
| 382440 ||  || — || November 2, 1999 || Kitt Peak || Spacewatch || — || align=right | 1.3 km || 
|-id=441 bgcolor=#fefefe
| 382441 ||  || — || November 9, 1999 || Socorro || LINEAR || FLO || align=right data-sort-value="0.58" | 580 m || 
|-id=442 bgcolor=#E9E9E9
| 382442 ||  || — || November 1, 1999 || Kitt Peak || Spacewatch || WIT || align=right | 1.3 km || 
|-id=443 bgcolor=#E9E9E9
| 382443 ||  || — || December 11, 1999 || Socorro || LINEAR || — || align=right | 4.2 km || 
|-id=444 bgcolor=#E9E9E9
| 382444 ||  || — || December 16, 1999 || Kitt Peak || Spacewatch || MRX || align=right | 1.0 km || 
|-id=445 bgcolor=#fefefe
| 382445 ||  || — || December 31, 1999 || Kitt Peak || Spacewatch || — || align=right data-sort-value="0.65" | 650 m || 
|-id=446 bgcolor=#fefefe
| 382446 ||  || — || January 30, 2000 || Socorro || LINEAR || PHO || align=right | 1.5 km || 
|-id=447 bgcolor=#E9E9E9
| 382447 ||  || — || February 25, 2000 || Catalina || CSS || — || align=right | 2.7 km || 
|-id=448 bgcolor=#E9E9E9
| 382448 ||  || — || May 26, 2000 || Prescott || P. G. Comba || — || align=right | 1.0 km || 
|-id=449 bgcolor=#d6d6d6
| 382449 ||  || — || July 3, 2000 || Kitt Peak || Spacewatch || — || align=right | 3.4 km || 
|-id=450 bgcolor=#E9E9E9
| 382450 ||  || — || July 30, 2000 || Socorro || LINEAR || — || align=right | 4.7 km || 
|-id=451 bgcolor=#d6d6d6
| 382451 ||  || — || August 3, 2000 || Kitt Peak || Spacewatch || HYG || align=right | 3.1 km || 
|-id=452 bgcolor=#E9E9E9
| 382452 ||  || — || August 24, 2000 || Bergisch Gladbac || W. Bickel || EUN || align=right | 1.3 km || 
|-id=453 bgcolor=#E9E9E9
| 382453 ||  || — || August 24, 2000 || Socorro || LINEAR || — || align=right | 1.3 km || 
|-id=454 bgcolor=#E9E9E9
| 382454 ||  || — || August 28, 2000 || Socorro || LINEAR || — || align=right | 3.8 km || 
|-id=455 bgcolor=#E9E9E9
| 382455 ||  || — || August 28, 2000 || Socorro || LINEAR || — || align=right | 1.0 km || 
|-id=456 bgcolor=#FA8072
| 382456 ||  || — || August 25, 2000 || Socorro || LINEAR || — || align=right | 1.4 km || 
|-id=457 bgcolor=#E9E9E9
| 382457 ||  || — || August 25, 2000 || Socorro || LINEAR || — || align=right | 1.8 km || 
|-id=458 bgcolor=#E9E9E9
| 382458 ||  || — || September 3, 2000 || Socorro || LINEAR || — || align=right data-sort-value="0.99" | 990 m || 
|-id=459 bgcolor=#FFC2E0
| 382459 ||  || — || September 23, 2000 || Socorro || LINEAR || AMO || align=right data-sort-value="0.50" | 500 m || 
|-id=460 bgcolor=#E9E9E9
| 382460 ||  || — || September 23, 2000 || Socorro || LINEAR || — || align=right | 1.3 km || 
|-id=461 bgcolor=#E9E9E9
| 382461 ||  || — || September 24, 2000 || Socorro || LINEAR || — || align=right | 1.3 km || 
|-id=462 bgcolor=#E9E9E9
| 382462 ||  || — || September 28, 2000 || Socorro || LINEAR || — || align=right | 1.1 km || 
|-id=463 bgcolor=#E9E9E9
| 382463 ||  || — || September 22, 2000 || Socorro || LINEAR || — || align=right | 1.3 km || 
|-id=464 bgcolor=#E9E9E9
| 382464 ||  || — || September 23, 2000 || Socorro || LINEAR || — || align=right | 1.1 km || 
|-id=465 bgcolor=#fefefe
| 382465 ||  || — || September 24, 2000 || Socorro || LINEAR || — || align=right data-sort-value="0.86" | 860 m || 
|-id=466 bgcolor=#E9E9E9
| 382466 ||  || — || September 27, 2000 || Socorro || LINEAR || — || align=right | 1.2 km || 
|-id=467 bgcolor=#E9E9E9
| 382467 ||  || — || September 30, 2000 || Socorro || LINEAR || — || align=right | 1.7 km || 
|-id=468 bgcolor=#E9E9E9
| 382468 ||  || — || September 28, 2000 || Socorro || LINEAR || — || align=right | 1.1 km || 
|-id=469 bgcolor=#fefefe
| 382469 ||  || — || September 21, 2000 || Kitt Peak || Spacewatch || — || align=right data-sort-value="0.82" | 820 m || 
|-id=470 bgcolor=#E9E9E9
| 382470 ||  || — || October 2, 2000 || Socorro || LINEAR || — || align=right | 1.2 km || 
|-id=471 bgcolor=#E9E9E9
| 382471 ||  || — || October 31, 2000 || Oaxaca || J. M. Roe || RAF || align=right | 1.4 km || 
|-id=472 bgcolor=#E9E9E9
| 382472 ||  || — || October 25, 2000 || Socorro || LINEAR || — || align=right | 1.8 km || 
|-id=473 bgcolor=#E9E9E9
| 382473 ||  || — || October 24, 2000 || Socorro || LINEAR || — || align=right | 3.4 km || 
|-id=474 bgcolor=#E9E9E9
| 382474 ||  || — || November 3, 2000 || Socorro || LINEAR || — || align=right | 2.2 km || 
|-id=475 bgcolor=#E9E9E9
| 382475 ||  || — || November 20, 2000 || Socorro || LINEAR || JUN || align=right | 1.2 km || 
|-id=476 bgcolor=#E9E9E9
| 382476 ||  || — || November 18, 2000 || Anderson Mesa || LONEOS || — || align=right | 1.0 km || 
|-id=477 bgcolor=#E9E9E9
| 382477 ||  || — || November 19, 2000 || Anderson Mesa || LONEOS || — || align=right | 2.2 km || 
|-id=478 bgcolor=#E9E9E9
| 382478 ||  || — || December 5, 2000 || Socorro || LINEAR || — || align=right | 1.9 km || 
|-id=479 bgcolor=#E9E9E9
| 382479 ||  || — || December 5, 2000 || Socorro || LINEAR || JUN || align=right | 1.2 km || 
|-id=480 bgcolor=#E9E9E9
| 382480 ||  || — || December 16, 2000 || Kitt Peak || Spacewatch || — || align=right | 2.3 km || 
|-id=481 bgcolor=#E9E9E9
| 382481 ||  || — || December 20, 2000 || Kitt Peak || Spacewatch || — || align=right | 2.0 km || 
|-id=482 bgcolor=#E9E9E9
| 382482 ||  || — || January 2, 2001 || Socorro || LINEAR || ADE || align=right | 2.3 km || 
|-id=483 bgcolor=#E9E9E9
| 382483 ||  || — || January 2, 2001 || Socorro || LINEAR || — || align=right | 2.2 km || 
|-id=484 bgcolor=#E9E9E9
| 382484 ||  || — || January 5, 2001 || Socorro || LINEAR || — || align=right | 1.2 km || 
|-id=485 bgcolor=#fefefe
| 382485 ||  || — || January 17, 2001 || Socorro || LINEAR || H || align=right data-sort-value="0.63" | 630 m || 
|-id=486 bgcolor=#FA8072
| 382486 ||  || — || February 3, 2001 || Prescott || P. G. Comba || — || align=right | 2.5 km || 
|-id=487 bgcolor=#fefefe
| 382487 ||  || — || February 18, 2001 || Haleakala || NEAT || H || align=right data-sort-value="0.67" | 670 m || 
|-id=488 bgcolor=#E9E9E9
| 382488 ||  || — || February 22, 2001 || Socorro || LINEAR || — || align=right | 3.8 km || 
|-id=489 bgcolor=#E9E9E9
| 382489 ||  || — || March 18, 2001 || Socorro || LINEAR || — || align=right | 2.6 km || 
|-id=490 bgcolor=#fefefe
| 382490 ||  || — || February 16, 2001 || Socorro || LINEAR || — || align=right | 1.1 km || 
|-id=491 bgcolor=#fefefe
| 382491 ||  || — || July 3, 2001 || Haleakala || NEAT || H || align=right data-sort-value="0.84" | 840 m || 
|-id=492 bgcolor=#FA8072
| 382492 ||  || — || July 22, 2001 || Palomar || NEAT || — || align=right | 1.1 km || 
|-id=493 bgcolor=#fefefe
| 382493 ||  || — || August 8, 2001 || Haleakala || NEAT || NYS || align=right data-sort-value="0.74" | 740 m || 
|-id=494 bgcolor=#fefefe
| 382494 ||  || — || August 12, 2001 || Palomar || NEAT || H || align=right data-sort-value="0.70" | 700 m || 
|-id=495 bgcolor=#fefefe
| 382495 ||  || — || August 16, 2001 || Socorro || LINEAR || PHO || align=right | 1.8 km || 
|-id=496 bgcolor=#fefefe
| 382496 ||  || — || August 24, 2001 || Ondřejov || P. Kušnirák, P. Pravec || — || align=right | 1.00 km || 
|-id=497 bgcolor=#fefefe
| 382497 ||  || — || August 20, 2001 || Socorro || LINEAR || — || align=right | 1.1 km || 
|-id=498 bgcolor=#fefefe
| 382498 ||  || — || August 26, 2001 || Prescott || P. G. Comba || NYS || align=right data-sort-value="0.82" | 820 m || 
|-id=499 bgcolor=#fefefe
| 382499 ||  || — || August 23, 2001 || Kitt Peak || Spacewatch || — || align=right data-sort-value="0.80" | 800 m || 
|-id=500 bgcolor=#fefefe
| 382500 ||  || — || August 23, 2001 || Anderson Mesa || LONEOS || MAS || align=right data-sort-value="0.78" | 780 m || 
|}

382501–382600 

|-bgcolor=#fefefe
| 382501 ||  || — || August 19, 2001 || Socorro || LINEAR || — || align=right | 1.2 km || 
|-id=502 bgcolor=#d6d6d6
| 382502 ||  || — || September 9, 2001 || Desert Eagle || W. K. Y. Yeung || — || align=right | 3.4 km || 
|-id=503 bgcolor=#FFC2E0
| 382503 ||  || — || September 8, 2001 || Socorro || LINEAR || AMO || align=right data-sort-value="0.51" | 510 m || 
|-id=504 bgcolor=#fefefe
| 382504 ||  || — || September 7, 2001 || Socorro || LINEAR || — || align=right data-sort-value="0.83" | 830 m || 
|-id=505 bgcolor=#d6d6d6
| 382505 ||  || — || September 12, 2001 || Socorro || LINEAR || 637 || align=right | 3.4 km || 
|-id=506 bgcolor=#fefefe
| 382506 ||  || — || September 12, 2001 || Socorro || LINEAR || NYS || align=right data-sort-value="0.81" | 810 m || 
|-id=507 bgcolor=#fefefe
| 382507 ||  || — || September 17, 2001 || Desert Eagle || W. K. Y. Yeung || NYS || align=right data-sort-value="0.86" | 860 m || 
|-id=508 bgcolor=#d6d6d6
| 382508 ||  || — || September 18, 2001 || Kitt Peak || Spacewatch || — || align=right | 2.6 km || 
|-id=509 bgcolor=#fefefe
| 382509 ||  || — || September 16, 2001 || Socorro || LINEAR || EUT || align=right data-sort-value="0.68" | 680 m || 
|-id=510 bgcolor=#fefefe
| 382510 ||  || — || September 16, 2001 || Socorro || LINEAR || V || align=right data-sort-value="0.89" | 890 m || 
|-id=511 bgcolor=#fefefe
| 382511 ||  || — || September 16, 2001 || Socorro || LINEAR || — || align=right data-sort-value="0.97" | 970 m || 
|-id=512 bgcolor=#fefefe
| 382512 ||  || — || September 16, 2001 || Socorro || LINEAR || MAS || align=right data-sort-value="0.88" | 880 m || 
|-id=513 bgcolor=#d6d6d6
| 382513 ||  || — || September 20, 2001 || Socorro || LINEAR || HYG || align=right | 2.9 km || 
|-id=514 bgcolor=#d6d6d6
| 382514 ||  || — || September 20, 2001 || Socorro || LINEAR || THB || align=right | 3.6 km || 
|-id=515 bgcolor=#fefefe
| 382515 ||  || — || September 20, 2001 || Socorro || LINEAR || — || align=right data-sort-value="0.83" | 830 m || 
|-id=516 bgcolor=#fefefe
| 382516 ||  || — || September 16, 2001 || Socorro || LINEAR || — || align=right | 1.0 km || 
|-id=517 bgcolor=#fefefe
| 382517 ||  || — || September 16, 2001 || Socorro || LINEAR || NYS || align=right data-sort-value="0.79" | 790 m || 
|-id=518 bgcolor=#fefefe
| 382518 ||  || — || September 17, 2001 || Socorro || LINEAR || — || align=right | 1.0 km || 
|-id=519 bgcolor=#fefefe
| 382519 ||  || — || September 16, 2001 || Socorro || LINEAR || MAS || align=right data-sort-value="0.98" | 980 m || 
|-id=520 bgcolor=#fefefe
| 382520 ||  || — || September 16, 2001 || Socorro || LINEAR || NYS || align=right data-sort-value="0.84" | 840 m || 
|-id=521 bgcolor=#fefefe
| 382521 ||  || — || September 19, 2001 || Socorro || LINEAR || NYS || align=right data-sort-value="0.73" | 730 m || 
|-id=522 bgcolor=#fefefe
| 382522 ||  || — || September 19, 2001 || Socorro || LINEAR || NYS || align=right data-sort-value="0.88" | 880 m || 
|-id=523 bgcolor=#fefefe
| 382523 ||  || — || September 19, 2001 || Socorro || LINEAR || — || align=right data-sort-value="0.77" | 770 m || 
|-id=524 bgcolor=#fefefe
| 382524 ||  || — || September 19, 2001 || Socorro || LINEAR || NYS || align=right data-sort-value="0.84" | 840 m || 
|-id=525 bgcolor=#fefefe
| 382525 ||  || — || September 19, 2001 || Socorro || LINEAR || — || align=right | 1.1 km || 
|-id=526 bgcolor=#fefefe
| 382526 ||  || — || September 25, 2001 || Desert Eagle || W. K. Y. Yeung || — || align=right data-sort-value="0.92" | 920 m || 
|-id=527 bgcolor=#fefefe
| 382527 ||  || — || September 19, 2001 || Kitt Peak || Spacewatch || MAS || align=right data-sort-value="0.70" | 700 m || 
|-id=528 bgcolor=#fefefe
| 382528 ||  || — || September 20, 2001 || Socorro || LINEAR || NYS || align=right data-sort-value="0.67" | 670 m || 
|-id=529 bgcolor=#FA8072
| 382529 ||  || — || September 21, 2001 || Socorro || LINEAR || — || align=right data-sort-value="0.52" | 520 m || 
|-id=530 bgcolor=#fefefe
| 382530 ||  || — || September 19, 2001 || Kitt Peak || Spacewatch || NYS || align=right data-sort-value="0.71" | 710 m || 
|-id=531 bgcolor=#fefefe
| 382531 ||  || — || October 14, 2001 || Cima Ekar || ADAS || — || align=right | 1.1 km || 
|-id=532 bgcolor=#fefefe
| 382532 ||  || — || October 13, 2001 || Socorro || LINEAR || MAS || align=right data-sort-value="0.85" | 850 m || 
|-id=533 bgcolor=#fefefe
| 382533 ||  || — || October 13, 2001 || Socorro || LINEAR || — || align=right data-sort-value="0.96" | 960 m || 
|-id=534 bgcolor=#fefefe
| 382534 ||  || — || October 10, 2001 || Palomar || NEAT || — || align=right | 1.0 km || 
|-id=535 bgcolor=#fefefe
| 382535 ||  || — || October 14, 2001 || Kitt Peak || Spacewatch || — || align=right | 1.1 km || 
|-id=536 bgcolor=#fefefe
| 382536 ||  || — || October 11, 2001 || Palomar || NEAT || MAS || align=right data-sort-value="0.90" | 900 m || 
|-id=537 bgcolor=#fefefe
| 382537 ||  || — || October 11, 2001 || Palomar || NEAT || NYS || align=right data-sort-value="0.69" | 690 m || 
|-id=538 bgcolor=#d6d6d6
| 382538 ||  || — || October 14, 2001 || Socorro || LINEAR || HYG || align=right | 3.2 km || 
|-id=539 bgcolor=#fefefe
| 382539 ||  || — || October 14, 2001 || Socorro || LINEAR || — || align=right | 1.0 km || 
|-id=540 bgcolor=#d6d6d6
| 382540 ||  || — || October 14, 2001 || Socorro || LINEAR || — || align=right | 3.7 km || 
|-id=541 bgcolor=#fefefe
| 382541 ||  || — || October 15, 2001 || Palomar || NEAT || V || align=right data-sort-value="0.79" | 790 m || 
|-id=542 bgcolor=#fefefe
| 382542 ||  || — || October 16, 2001 || Socorro || LINEAR || NYS || align=right data-sort-value="0.84" | 840 m || 
|-id=543 bgcolor=#fefefe
| 382543 ||  || — || October 17, 2001 || Socorro || LINEAR || NYS || align=right data-sort-value="0.92" | 920 m || 
|-id=544 bgcolor=#fefefe
| 382544 ||  || — || October 20, 2001 || Socorro || LINEAR || — || align=right | 1.0 km || 
|-id=545 bgcolor=#fefefe
| 382545 ||  || — || October 20, 2001 || Socorro || LINEAR || 417 || align=right data-sort-value="0.81" | 810 m || 
|-id=546 bgcolor=#d6d6d6
| 382546 ||  || — || October 17, 2001 || Socorro || LINEAR || HYG || align=right | 2.8 km || 
|-id=547 bgcolor=#d6d6d6
| 382547 ||  || — || October 20, 2001 || Socorro || LINEAR || ELF || align=right | 4.8 km || 
|-id=548 bgcolor=#fefefe
| 382548 ||  || — || October 16, 2001 || Socorro || LINEAR || NYS || align=right data-sort-value="0.83" | 830 m || 
|-id=549 bgcolor=#d6d6d6
| 382549 ||  || — || October 17, 2001 || Socorro || LINEAR || — || align=right | 3.4 km || 
|-id=550 bgcolor=#fefefe
| 382550 ||  || — || October 20, 2001 || Palomar || NEAT || — || align=right data-sort-value="0.92" | 920 m || 
|-id=551 bgcolor=#fefefe
| 382551 ||  || — || November 9, 2001 || Palomar || NEAT || — || align=right | 1.0 km || 
|-id=552 bgcolor=#d6d6d6
| 382552 ||  || — || November 10, 2001 || Socorro || LINEAR || THB || align=right | 3.8 km || 
|-id=553 bgcolor=#d6d6d6
| 382553 ||  || — || October 15, 2001 || Socorro || LINEAR || — || align=right | 4.2 km || 
|-id=554 bgcolor=#fefefe
| 382554 ||  || — || November 12, 2001 || Socorro || LINEAR || — || align=right | 1.1 km || 
|-id=555 bgcolor=#fefefe
| 382555 ||  || — || November 12, 2001 || Socorro || LINEAR || NYS || align=right | 1.0 km || 
|-id=556 bgcolor=#fefefe
| 382556 ||  || — || November 9, 2001 || Socorro || LINEAR || NYS || align=right data-sort-value="0.75" | 750 m || 
|-id=557 bgcolor=#d6d6d6
| 382557 ||  || — || November 20, 2001 || Socorro || LINEAR || — || align=right | 3.8 km || 
|-id=558 bgcolor=#E9E9E9
| 382558 ||  || — || December 9, 2001 || Socorro || LINEAR || — || align=right | 2.6 km || 
|-id=559 bgcolor=#d6d6d6
| 382559 ||  || — || December 14, 2001 || Socorro || LINEAR || — || align=right | 3.2 km || 
|-id=560 bgcolor=#E9E9E9
| 382560 ||  || — || December 13, 2001 || Socorro || LINEAR || — || align=right | 1.5 km || 
|-id=561 bgcolor=#fefefe
| 382561 ||  || — || December 15, 2001 || Socorro || LINEAR || NYS || align=right data-sort-value="0.86" | 860 m || 
|-id=562 bgcolor=#E9E9E9
| 382562 ||  || — || December 14, 2001 || Socorro || LINEAR || — || align=right | 2.6 km || 
|-id=563 bgcolor=#d6d6d6
| 382563 ||  || — || December 14, 2001 || Socorro || LINEAR || EUP || align=right | 3.8 km || 
|-id=564 bgcolor=#fefefe
| 382564 ||  || — || December 18, 2001 || Socorro || LINEAR || — || align=right | 1.0 km || 
|-id=565 bgcolor=#E9E9E9
| 382565 ||  || — || January 9, 2002 || Socorro || LINEAR || — || align=right | 1.4 km || 
|-id=566 bgcolor=#E9E9E9
| 382566 ||  || — || January 9, 2002 || Socorro || LINEAR || — || align=right | 1.1 km || 
|-id=567 bgcolor=#E9E9E9
| 382567 ||  || — || January 9, 2002 || Socorro || LINEAR || — || align=right | 1.3 km || 
|-id=568 bgcolor=#E9E9E9
| 382568 ||  || — || January 9, 2002 || Socorro || LINEAR || — || align=right data-sort-value="0.69" | 690 m || 
|-id=569 bgcolor=#E9E9E9
| 382569 ||  || — || January 9, 2002 || Kitt Peak || Spacewatch || — || align=right data-sort-value="0.80" | 800 m || 
|-id=570 bgcolor=#E9E9E9
| 382570 ||  || — || January 9, 2002 || Socorro || LINEAR || — || align=right | 1.6 km || 
|-id=571 bgcolor=#E9E9E9
| 382571 ||  || — || January 13, 2002 || Socorro || LINEAR || — || align=right data-sort-value="0.81" | 810 m || 
|-id=572 bgcolor=#E9E9E9
| 382572 ||  || — || January 14, 2002 || Socorro || LINEAR || — || align=right data-sort-value="0.58" | 580 m || 
|-id=573 bgcolor=#E9E9E9
| 382573 ||  || — || January 14, 2002 || Socorro || LINEAR || MAR || align=right data-sort-value="0.99" | 990 m || 
|-id=574 bgcolor=#E9E9E9
| 382574 ||  || — || January 13, 2002 || Kitt Peak || Spacewatch || — || align=right | 2.8 km || 
|-id=575 bgcolor=#E9E9E9
| 382575 ||  || — || January 20, 2002 || Kitt Peak || Spacewatch || — || align=right data-sort-value="0.87" | 870 m || 
|-id=576 bgcolor=#E9E9E9
| 382576 ||  || — || January 17, 2002 || Palomar || NEAT || — || align=right | 1.8 km || 
|-id=577 bgcolor=#E9E9E9
| 382577 ||  || — || February 7, 2002 || Socorro || LINEAR || — || align=right | 1.5 km || 
|-id=578 bgcolor=#E9E9E9
| 382578 ||  || — || February 7, 2002 || Socorro || LINEAR || EUN || align=right | 1.5 km || 
|-id=579 bgcolor=#E9E9E9
| 382579 ||  || — || February 7, 2002 || Socorro || LINEAR || — || align=right | 1.5 km || 
|-id=580 bgcolor=#E9E9E9
| 382580 ||  || — || February 10, 2002 || Socorro || LINEAR || — || align=right data-sort-value="0.89" | 890 m || 
|-id=581 bgcolor=#E9E9E9
| 382581 ||  || — || February 10, 2002 || Socorro || LINEAR || — || align=right data-sort-value="0.99" | 990 m || 
|-id=582 bgcolor=#FA8072
| 382582 ||  || — || February 11, 2002 || Socorro || LINEAR || — || align=right | 1.1 km || 
|-id=583 bgcolor=#E9E9E9
| 382583 ||  || — || February 8, 2002 || Socorro || LINEAR || — || align=right | 1.4 km || 
|-id=584 bgcolor=#E9E9E9
| 382584 ||  || — || February 10, 2002 || Socorro || LINEAR || — || align=right | 1.1 km || 
|-id=585 bgcolor=#E9E9E9
| 382585 ||  || — || February 10, 2002 || Socorro || LINEAR || — || align=right | 1.2 km || 
|-id=586 bgcolor=#FA8072
| 382586 ||  || — || February 10, 2002 || Socorro || LINEAR || — || align=right data-sort-value="0.67" | 670 m || 
|-id=587 bgcolor=#E9E9E9
| 382587 ||  || — || February 8, 2002 || Kitt Peak || Spacewatch || — || align=right data-sort-value="0.99" | 990 m || 
|-id=588 bgcolor=#E9E9E9
| 382588 ||  || — || February 12, 2002 || Palomar || NEAT || MAR || align=right | 1.2 km || 
|-id=589 bgcolor=#E9E9E9
| 382589 ||  || — || February 5, 2002 || Palomar || NEAT || — || align=right | 1.0 km || 
|-id=590 bgcolor=#E9E9E9
| 382590 ||  || — || February 10, 2002 || Socorro || LINEAR || — || align=right | 1.2 km || 
|-id=591 bgcolor=#E9E9E9
| 382591 ||  || — || February 12, 2002 || Socorro || LINEAR || — || align=right | 1.5 km || 
|-id=592 bgcolor=#E9E9E9
| 382592 ||  || — || February 12, 2002 || Socorro || LINEAR || — || align=right | 1.3 km || 
|-id=593 bgcolor=#E9E9E9
| 382593 ||  || — || February 4, 2002 || Palomar || NEAT || — || align=right | 1.1 km || 
|-id=594 bgcolor=#E9E9E9
| 382594 ||  || — || February 20, 2002 || Anderson Mesa || LONEOS || JUN || align=right | 1.5 km || 
|-id=595 bgcolor=#E9E9E9
| 382595 ||  || — || February 20, 2002 || Socorro || LINEAR || — || align=right | 1.00 km || 
|-id=596 bgcolor=#E9E9E9
| 382596 ||  || — || March 5, 2002 || Nashville || R. Clingan || — || align=right | 1.0 km || 
|-id=597 bgcolor=#E9E9E9
| 382597 ||  || — || March 13, 2002 || Socorro || LINEAR || EUN || align=right | 1.4 km || 
|-id=598 bgcolor=#E9E9E9
| 382598 ||  || — || March 10, 2002 || Kitt Peak || Spacewatch || — || align=right | 1.7 km || 
|-id=599 bgcolor=#E9E9E9
| 382599 ||  || — || March 9, 2002 || Anderson Mesa || LONEOS || — || align=right | 1.3 km || 
|-id=600 bgcolor=#E9E9E9
| 382600 ||  || — || March 12, 2002 || Palomar || NEAT || — || align=right data-sort-value="0.88" | 880 m || 
|}

382601–382700 

|-bgcolor=#E9E9E9
| 382601 ||  || — || March 12, 2002 || Kitt Peak || Spacewatch || — || align=right data-sort-value="0.83" | 830 m || 
|-id=602 bgcolor=#E9E9E9
| 382602 ||  || — || April 15, 2002 || Desert Eagle || W. K. Y. Yeung || — || align=right | 1.2 km || 
|-id=603 bgcolor=#E9E9E9
| 382603 ||  || — || April 8, 2002 || Palomar || NEAT || — || align=right | 1.0 km || 
|-id=604 bgcolor=#E9E9E9
| 382604 ||  || — || April 9, 2002 || Palomar || NEAT || — || align=right | 1.2 km || 
|-id=605 bgcolor=#E9E9E9
| 382605 ||  || — || April 10, 2002 || Palomar || NEAT || EUN || align=right | 1.8 km || 
|-id=606 bgcolor=#E9E9E9
| 382606 ||  || — || May 5, 2002 || Socorro || LINEAR || — || align=right | 1.7 km || 
|-id=607 bgcolor=#fefefe
| 382607 ||  || — || May 14, 2002 || Palomar || NEAT || H || align=right data-sort-value="0.76" | 760 m || 
|-id=608 bgcolor=#d6d6d6
| 382608 ||  || — || June 8, 2002 || Socorro || LINEAR || — || align=right | 3.6 km || 
|-id=609 bgcolor=#E9E9E9
| 382609 ||  || — || June 9, 2002 || Haleakala || NEAT || — || align=right | 3.0 km || 
|-id=610 bgcolor=#E9E9E9
| 382610 ||  || — || June 1, 2002 || Palomar || NEAT || — || align=right | 1.5 km || 
|-id=611 bgcolor=#fefefe
| 382611 ||  || — || July 5, 2002 || Socorro || LINEAR || — || align=right | 1.0 km || 
|-id=612 bgcolor=#fefefe
| 382612 ||  || — || July 14, 2002 || Palomar || NEAT || — || align=right | 1.1 km || 
|-id=613 bgcolor=#fefefe
| 382613 ||  || — || July 13, 2002 || Socorro || LINEAR || H || align=right | 1.0 km || 
|-id=614 bgcolor=#d6d6d6
| 382614 ||  || — || July 9, 2002 || Palomar || NEAT || BRA || align=right | 1.9 km || 
|-id=615 bgcolor=#FA8072
| 382615 ||  || — || July 8, 2002 || Palomar || NEAT || PHO || align=right data-sort-value="0.98" | 980 m || 
|-id=616 bgcolor=#E9E9E9
| 382616 ||  || — || July 21, 2002 || Palomar || NEAT || — || align=right | 1.8 km || 
|-id=617 bgcolor=#E9E9E9
| 382617 ||  || — || July 28, 2002 || Palomar || NEAT || ADE || align=right | 2.1 km || 
|-id=618 bgcolor=#d6d6d6
| 382618 ||  || — || July 29, 2002 || Palomar || NEAT || KOR || align=right | 1.3 km || 
|-id=619 bgcolor=#E9E9E9
| 382619 ||  || — || August 6, 2002 || Palomar || NEAT || — || align=right | 2.8 km || 
|-id=620 bgcolor=#E9E9E9
| 382620 ||  || — || August 6, 2002 || Palomar || NEAT || — || align=right | 1.4 km || 
|-id=621 bgcolor=#fefefe
| 382621 ||  || — || August 11, 2002 || Palomar || NEAT || FLO || align=right data-sort-value="0.83" | 830 m || 
|-id=622 bgcolor=#fefefe
| 382622 ||  || — || August 12, 2002 || Socorro || LINEAR || H || align=right data-sort-value="0.60" | 600 m || 
|-id=623 bgcolor=#fefefe
| 382623 ||  || — || August 12, 2002 || Socorro || LINEAR || — || align=right data-sort-value="0.79" | 790 m || 
|-id=624 bgcolor=#fefefe
| 382624 ||  || — || August 13, 2002 || Anderson Mesa || LONEOS || NYS || align=right data-sort-value="0.69" | 690 m || 
|-id=625 bgcolor=#FFC2E0
| 382625 ||  || — || August 7, 2002 || Palomar || NEAT || AMO || align=right data-sort-value="0.75" | 750 m || 
|-id=626 bgcolor=#fefefe
| 382626 ||  || — || August 8, 2002 || Palomar || NEAT || — || align=right data-sort-value="0.67" | 670 m || 
|-id=627 bgcolor=#fefefe
| 382627 ||  || — || August 8, 2002 || Palomar || NEAT || H || align=right data-sort-value="0.82" | 820 m || 
|-id=628 bgcolor=#d6d6d6
| 382628 ||  || — || August 15, 2002 || Palomar || NEAT || 628 || align=right | 2.0 km || 
|-id=629 bgcolor=#fefefe
| 382629 ||  || — || August 15, 2002 || Palomar || NEAT || — || align=right data-sort-value="0.82" | 820 m || 
|-id=630 bgcolor=#fefefe
| 382630 ||  || — || August 19, 2002 || Palomar || NEAT || — || align=right data-sort-value="0.73" | 730 m || 
|-id=631 bgcolor=#fefefe
| 382631 ||  || — || August 26, 2002 || Palomar || NEAT || V || align=right data-sort-value="0.68" | 680 m || 
|-id=632 bgcolor=#fefefe
| 382632 ||  || — || August 26, 2002 || Palomar || NEAT || PHO || align=right | 1.2 km || 
|-id=633 bgcolor=#fefefe
| 382633 ||  || — || August 18, 2002 || Palomar || NEAT || H || align=right data-sort-value="0.50" | 500 m || 
|-id=634 bgcolor=#fefefe
| 382634 ||  || — || August 30, 2002 || Palomar || NEAT || FLO || align=right data-sort-value="0.72" | 720 m || 
|-id=635 bgcolor=#E9E9E9
| 382635 ||  || — || August 17, 2002 || Palomar || NEAT || — || align=right | 2.8 km || 
|-id=636 bgcolor=#fefefe
| 382636 ||  || — || August 18, 2002 || Palomar || NEAT || FLO || align=right data-sort-value="0.57" | 570 m || 
|-id=637 bgcolor=#d6d6d6
| 382637 ||  || — || August 28, 2002 || Palomar || NEAT || — || align=right | 3.1 km || 
|-id=638 bgcolor=#fefefe
| 382638 ||  || — || August 30, 2002 || Palomar || NEAT || — || align=right data-sort-value="0.62" | 620 m || 
|-id=639 bgcolor=#fefefe
| 382639 ||  || — || August 17, 2002 || Palomar || NEAT || — || align=right data-sort-value="0.88" | 880 m || 
|-id=640 bgcolor=#fefefe
| 382640 ||  || — || August 20, 2002 || Palomar || NEAT || FLO || align=right data-sort-value="0.67" | 670 m || 
|-id=641 bgcolor=#fefefe
| 382641 ||  || — || September 4, 2002 || Palomar || NEAT || PHO || align=right | 1.5 km || 
|-id=642 bgcolor=#fefefe
| 382642 ||  || — || September 5, 2002 || Socorro || LINEAR || — || align=right | 1.2 km || 
|-id=643 bgcolor=#fefefe
| 382643 ||  || — || September 9, 2002 || Palomar || NEAT || — || align=right data-sort-value="0.80" | 800 m || 
|-id=644 bgcolor=#fefefe
| 382644 ||  || — || September 10, 2002 || Palomar || NEAT || — || align=right data-sort-value="0.80" | 800 m || 
|-id=645 bgcolor=#fefefe
| 382645 ||  || — || September 11, 2002 || Palomar || NEAT || V || align=right data-sort-value="0.63" | 630 m || 
|-id=646 bgcolor=#fefefe
| 382646 ||  || — || September 13, 2002 || Palomar || NEAT || — || align=right | 1.0 km || 
|-id=647 bgcolor=#d6d6d6
| 382647 ||  || — || September 13, 2002 || Palomar || NEAT || — || align=right | 2.8 km || 
|-id=648 bgcolor=#fefefe
| 382648 ||  || — || September 12, 2002 || Palomar || NEAT || V || align=right data-sort-value="0.67" | 670 m || 
|-id=649 bgcolor=#fefefe
| 382649 ||  || — || September 13, 2002 || Socorro || LINEAR || — || align=right data-sort-value="0.87" | 870 m || 
|-id=650 bgcolor=#fefefe
| 382650 ||  || — || September 4, 2002 || Palomar || NEAT || — || align=right data-sort-value="0.67" | 670 m || 
|-id=651 bgcolor=#fefefe
| 382651 ||  || — || September 14, 2002 || Palomar || NEAT || — || align=right data-sort-value="0.88" | 880 m || 
|-id=652 bgcolor=#fefefe
| 382652 ||  || — || September 26, 2002 || Palomar || NEAT || — || align=right data-sort-value="0.71" | 710 m || 
|-id=653 bgcolor=#fefefe
| 382653 ||  || — || September 27, 2002 || Palomar || NEAT || — || align=right data-sort-value="0.95" | 950 m || 
|-id=654 bgcolor=#fefefe
| 382654 ||  || — || September 29, 2002 || Haleakala || NEAT || — || align=right | 1.0 km || 
|-id=655 bgcolor=#fefefe
| 382655 ||  || — || September 27, 2002 || Palomar || NEAT || H || align=right data-sort-value="0.54" | 540 m || 
|-id=656 bgcolor=#d6d6d6
| 382656 ||  || — || September 26, 2002 || Palomar || NEAT || — || align=right | 2.2 km || 
|-id=657 bgcolor=#d6d6d6
| 382657 ||  || — || October 1, 2002 || Črni Vrh || Črni Vrh || — || align=right | 3.4 km || 
|-id=658 bgcolor=#d6d6d6
| 382658 ||  || — || October 2, 2002 || Socorro || LINEAR || — || align=right | 3.1 km || 
|-id=659 bgcolor=#d6d6d6
| 382659 ||  || — || October 3, 2002 || Campo Imperatore || CINEOS || — || align=right | 4.4 km || 
|-id=660 bgcolor=#fefefe
| 382660 ||  || — || October 1, 2002 || Anderson Mesa || LONEOS || FLO || align=right data-sort-value="0.75" | 750 m || 
|-id=661 bgcolor=#fefefe
| 382661 ||  || — || October 3, 2002 || Palomar || NEAT || — || align=right | 1.5 km || 
|-id=662 bgcolor=#fefefe
| 382662 ||  || — || October 3, 2002 || Socorro || LINEAR || — || align=right data-sort-value="0.63" | 630 m || 
|-id=663 bgcolor=#fefefe
| 382663 ||  || — || October 1, 1995 || Kitt Peak || Spacewatch || — || align=right data-sort-value="0.79" | 790 m || 
|-id=664 bgcolor=#fefefe
| 382664 ||  || — || October 4, 2002 || Socorro || LINEAR || — || align=right data-sort-value="0.79" | 790 m || 
|-id=665 bgcolor=#d6d6d6
| 382665 ||  || — || October 4, 2002 || Socorro || LINEAR || — || align=right | 3.2 km || 
|-id=666 bgcolor=#fefefe
| 382666 ||  || — || October 4, 2002 || Socorro || LINEAR || FLO || align=right data-sort-value="0.81" | 810 m || 
|-id=667 bgcolor=#fefefe
| 382667 ||  || — || October 1, 2002 || Anderson Mesa || LONEOS || — || align=right data-sort-value="0.89" | 890 m || 
|-id=668 bgcolor=#fefefe
| 382668 ||  || — || October 3, 2002 || Palomar || NEAT || V || align=right data-sort-value="0.88" | 880 m || 
|-id=669 bgcolor=#FA8072
| 382669 ||  || — || October 4, 2002 || Palomar || NEAT || — || align=right data-sort-value="0.95" | 950 m || 
|-id=670 bgcolor=#fefefe
| 382670 ||  || — || October 4, 2002 || Palomar || NEAT || — || align=right | 1.1 km || 
|-id=671 bgcolor=#fefefe
| 382671 ||  || — || October 5, 2002 || Palomar || NEAT || FLO || align=right data-sort-value="0.61" | 610 m || 
|-id=672 bgcolor=#fefefe
| 382672 ||  || — || October 4, 2002 || Socorro || LINEAR || — || align=right data-sort-value="0.78" | 780 m || 
|-id=673 bgcolor=#d6d6d6
| 382673 ||  || — || October 7, 2002 || Socorro || LINEAR || — || align=right | 3.2 km || 
|-id=674 bgcolor=#FA8072
| 382674 ||  || — || October 8, 2002 || Anderson Mesa || LONEOS || — || align=right data-sort-value="0.55" | 550 m || 
|-id=675 bgcolor=#fefefe
| 382675 ||  || — || October 10, 2002 || Socorro || LINEAR || — || align=right | 1.2 km || 
|-id=676 bgcolor=#fefefe
| 382676 ||  || — || October 10, 2002 || Socorro || LINEAR || — || align=right | 1.6 km || 
|-id=677 bgcolor=#d6d6d6
| 382677 ||  || — || October 4, 2002 || Apache Point || SDSS || TEL || align=right | 1.3 km || 
|-id=678 bgcolor=#fefefe
| 382678 ||  || — || October 5, 2002 || Apache Point || SDSS || — || align=right | 1.0 km || 
|-id=679 bgcolor=#fefefe
| 382679 ||  || — || October 10, 2002 || Apache Point || SDSS || — || align=right data-sort-value="0.78" | 780 m || 
|-id=680 bgcolor=#fefefe
| 382680 ||  || — || October 9, 2002 || Palomar || NEAT || FLO || align=right data-sort-value="0.43" | 430 m || 
|-id=681 bgcolor=#fefefe
| 382681 ||  || — || October 28, 2002 || Socorro || LINEAR || PHO || align=right | 1.5 km || 
|-id=682 bgcolor=#fefefe
| 382682 ||  || — || October 29, 2002 || Apache Point || SDSS || — || align=right data-sort-value="0.96" | 960 m || 
|-id=683 bgcolor=#d6d6d6
| 382683 ||  || — || October 29, 2002 || Apache Point || SDSS || EOS || align=right | 1.5 km || 
|-id=684 bgcolor=#fefefe
| 382684 ||  || — || October 16, 2002 || Palomar || NEAT || NYS || align=right data-sort-value="0.70" | 700 m || 
|-id=685 bgcolor=#fefefe
| 382685 ||  || — || October 31, 2002 || Palomar || NEAT || — || align=right data-sort-value="0.87" | 870 m || 
|-id=686 bgcolor=#d6d6d6
| 382686 ||  || — || November 6, 2002 || Needville || Needville Obs. || — || align=right | 3.1 km || 
|-id=687 bgcolor=#fefefe
| 382687 ||  || — || November 5, 2002 || Socorro || LINEAR || NYS || align=right | 1.5 km || 
|-id=688 bgcolor=#fefefe
| 382688 ||  || — || November 5, 2002 || Socorro || LINEAR || — || align=right data-sort-value="0.93" | 930 m || 
|-id=689 bgcolor=#fefefe
| 382689 ||  || — || November 5, 2002 || Socorro || LINEAR || — || align=right | 1.1 km || 
|-id=690 bgcolor=#fefefe
| 382690 ||  || — || November 6, 2002 || Anderson Mesa || LONEOS || NYS || align=right data-sort-value="0.68" | 680 m || 
|-id=691 bgcolor=#fefefe
| 382691 ||  || — || November 3, 2002 || Haleakala || NEAT || — || align=right data-sort-value="0.87" | 870 m || 
|-id=692 bgcolor=#fefefe
| 382692 ||  || — || November 4, 2002 || Palomar || NEAT || NYS || align=right data-sort-value="0.70" | 700 m || 
|-id=693 bgcolor=#fefefe
| 382693 ||  || — || November 5, 2002 || Socorro || LINEAR || — || align=right | 1.3 km || 
|-id=694 bgcolor=#fefefe
| 382694 ||  || — || November 6, 2002 || Socorro || LINEAR || FLO || align=right data-sort-value="0.76" | 760 m || 
|-id=695 bgcolor=#fefefe
| 382695 ||  || — || November 7, 2002 || Socorro || LINEAR || — || align=right data-sort-value="0.82" | 820 m || 
|-id=696 bgcolor=#fefefe
| 382696 ||  || — || November 11, 2002 || Anderson Mesa || LONEOS || — || align=right | 1.00 km || 
|-id=697 bgcolor=#d6d6d6
| 382697 ||  || — || November 12, 2002 || Anderson Mesa || LONEOS || — || align=right | 3.2 km || 
|-id=698 bgcolor=#d6d6d6
| 382698 ||  || — || November 12, 2002 || Socorro || LINEAR || Tj (2.89) || align=right | 6.1 km || 
|-id=699 bgcolor=#d6d6d6
| 382699 ||  || — || November 11, 2002 || Anderson Mesa || LONEOS || — || align=right | 2.7 km || 
|-id=700 bgcolor=#fefefe
| 382700 ||  || — || November 13, 2002 || Palomar || NEAT || NYS || align=right data-sort-value="0.77" | 770 m || 
|}

382701–382800 

|-bgcolor=#fefefe
| 382701 ||  || — || November 7, 2002 || Kitt Peak || M. W. Buie || MAS || align=right data-sort-value="0.52" | 520 m || 
|-id=702 bgcolor=#d6d6d6
| 382702 ||  || — || November 13, 2002 || Palomar || A. Lowe || — || align=right | 2.1 km || 
|-id=703 bgcolor=#d6d6d6
| 382703 ||  || — || November 13, 2002 || Apache Point || SDSS || MEL || align=right | 3.7 km || 
|-id=704 bgcolor=#d6d6d6
| 382704 ||  || — || November 5, 2002 || Palomar || NEAT || — || align=right | 3.8 km || 
|-id=705 bgcolor=#d6d6d6
| 382705 ||  || — || November 4, 2002 || Palomar || NEAT || — || align=right | 4.7 km || 
|-id=706 bgcolor=#fefefe
| 382706 ||  || — || November 13, 2002 || Palomar || NEAT || MAS || align=right data-sort-value="0.62" | 620 m || 
|-id=707 bgcolor=#fefefe
| 382707 ||  || — || November 24, 2002 || Palomar || S. F. Hönig || MAS || align=right data-sort-value="0.60" | 600 m || 
|-id=708 bgcolor=#fefefe
| 382708 ||  || — || November 24, 2002 || Palomar || NEAT || — || align=right data-sort-value="0.93" | 930 m || 
|-id=709 bgcolor=#d6d6d6
| 382709 ||  || — || November 24, 2002 || Palomar || NEAT || — || align=right | 3.4 km || 
|-id=710 bgcolor=#d6d6d6
| 382710 ||  || — || November 24, 2002 || Palomar || NEAT || — || align=right | 4.2 km || 
|-id=711 bgcolor=#fefefe
| 382711 ||  || — || November 24, 2002 || Palomar || NEAT || — || align=right data-sort-value="0.76" | 760 m || 
|-id=712 bgcolor=#fefefe
| 382712 ||  || — || November 16, 2002 || Palomar || NEAT || — || align=right data-sort-value="0.75" | 750 m || 
|-id=713 bgcolor=#fefefe
| 382713 ||  || — || December 1, 2002 || Nashville || R. Clingan || — || align=right data-sort-value="0.79" | 790 m || 
|-id=714 bgcolor=#d6d6d6
| 382714 ||  || — || December 1, 2002 || Socorro || LINEAR || — || align=right | 3.8 km || 
|-id=715 bgcolor=#fefefe
| 382715 ||  || — || November 14, 2002 || Socorro || LINEAR || ERI || align=right | 1.8 km || 
|-id=716 bgcolor=#fefefe
| 382716 ||  || — || December 6, 2002 || Socorro || LINEAR || FLO || align=right data-sort-value="0.79" | 790 m || 
|-id=717 bgcolor=#fefefe
| 382717 ||  || — || December 10, 2002 || Palomar || NEAT || — || align=right data-sort-value="0.81" | 810 m || 
|-id=718 bgcolor=#fefefe
| 382718 ||  || — || December 10, 2002 || Socorro || LINEAR || ERI || align=right | 1.6 km || 
|-id=719 bgcolor=#fefefe
| 382719 ||  || — || December 11, 2002 || Socorro || LINEAR || H || align=right data-sort-value="0.84" | 840 m || 
|-id=720 bgcolor=#fefefe
| 382720 ||  || — || December 11, 2002 || Socorro || LINEAR || PHO || align=right | 1.6 km || 
|-id=721 bgcolor=#d6d6d6
| 382721 ||  || — || December 11, 2002 || Socorro || LINEAR || — || align=right | 3.6 km || 
|-id=722 bgcolor=#fefefe
| 382722 ||  || — || December 3, 2002 || Uccle || T. Pauwels || NYS || align=right | 1.7 km || 
|-id=723 bgcolor=#fefefe
| 382723 ||  || — || December 10, 2002 || Palomar || NEAT || — || align=right data-sort-value="0.79" | 790 m || 
|-id=724 bgcolor=#fefefe
| 382724 ||  || — || December 31, 2002 || Socorro || LINEAR || — || align=right | 1.0 km || 
|-id=725 bgcolor=#fefefe
| 382725 ||  || — || December 31, 2002 || Socorro || LINEAR || MAS || align=right data-sort-value="0.92" | 920 m || 
|-id=726 bgcolor=#d6d6d6
| 382726 ||  || — || December 31, 2002 || Socorro || LINEAR || Tj (2.96) || align=right | 4.4 km || 
|-id=727 bgcolor=#fefefe
| 382727 ||  || — || January 2, 2003 || Socorro || LINEAR || PHO || align=right | 1.2 km || 
|-id=728 bgcolor=#fefefe
| 382728 ||  || — || January 5, 2003 || Socorro || LINEAR || — || align=right | 1.2 km || 
|-id=729 bgcolor=#d6d6d6
| 382729 ||  || — || January 4, 2003 || Socorro || LINEAR || — || align=right | 3.9 km || 
|-id=730 bgcolor=#d6d6d6
| 382730 ||  || — || January 5, 2003 || Socorro || LINEAR || — || align=right | 5.1 km || 
|-id=731 bgcolor=#d6d6d6
| 382731 ||  || — || January 7, 2003 || Socorro || LINEAR || — || align=right | 5.9 km || 
|-id=732 bgcolor=#d6d6d6
| 382732 ||  || — || December 5, 2002 || Socorro || LINEAR || — || align=right | 3.9 km || 
|-id=733 bgcolor=#d6d6d6
| 382733 ||  || — || December 5, 2002 || Socorro || LINEAR || — || align=right | 3.2 km || 
|-id=734 bgcolor=#d6d6d6
| 382734 ||  || — || January 8, 2003 || Socorro || LINEAR || — || align=right | 3.6 km || 
|-id=735 bgcolor=#fefefe
| 382735 ||  || — || January 9, 2003 || Socorro || LINEAR || — || align=right data-sort-value="0.72" | 720 m || 
|-id=736 bgcolor=#d6d6d6
| 382736 ||  || — || January 13, 2003 || Socorro || LINEAR || EUP || align=right | 6.2 km || 
|-id=737 bgcolor=#fefefe
| 382737 ||  || — || January 5, 2003 || Socorro || LINEAR || — || align=right | 1.7 km || 
|-id=738 bgcolor=#fefefe
| 382738 ||  || — || January 27, 2003 || Anderson Mesa || LONEOS || — || align=right | 1.2 km || 
|-id=739 bgcolor=#d6d6d6
| 382739 ||  || — || January 26, 2003 || Anderson Mesa || LONEOS || — || align=right | 3.9 km || 
|-id=740 bgcolor=#fefefe
| 382740 ||  || — || January 26, 2003 || Haleakala || NEAT || — || align=right data-sort-value="0.82" | 820 m || 
|-id=741 bgcolor=#d6d6d6
| 382741 ||  || — || January 25, 2003 || Palomar || NEAT || — || align=right | 3.9 km || 
|-id=742 bgcolor=#d6d6d6
| 382742 ||  || — || January 26, 2003 || Kitt Peak || Spacewatch || MEL || align=right | 4.0 km || 
|-id=743 bgcolor=#fefefe
| 382743 ||  || — || January 29, 2003 || Palomar || NEAT || — || align=right data-sort-value="0.88" | 880 m || 
|-id=744 bgcolor=#fefefe
| 382744 ||  || — || January 26, 2003 || Haleakala || NEAT || — || align=right | 1.0 km || 
|-id=745 bgcolor=#FFC2E0
| 382745 ||  || — || February 1, 2003 || Kitt Peak || Spacewatch || APOPHAcritical || align=right data-sort-value="0.31" | 310 m || 
|-id=746 bgcolor=#fefefe
| 382746 ||  || — || February 1, 2003 || Socorro || LINEAR || PHO || align=right | 1.6 km || 
|-id=747 bgcolor=#d6d6d6
| 382747 ||  || — || February 2, 2003 || Palomar || NEAT || — || align=right | 3.8 km || 
|-id=748 bgcolor=#d6d6d6
| 382748 ||  || — || October 24, 2001 || Kitt Peak || Spacewatch || — || align=right | 2.6 km || 
|-id=749 bgcolor=#d6d6d6
| 382749 ||  || — || February 19, 2003 || Palomar || NEAT || EUP || align=right | 4.5 km || 
|-id=750 bgcolor=#d6d6d6
| 382750 ||  || — || February 19, 2003 || Haleakala || NEAT || TIR || align=right | 4.0 km || 
|-id=751 bgcolor=#fefefe
| 382751 ||  || — || February 22, 2003 || Palomar || NEAT || H || align=right | 1.1 km || 
|-id=752 bgcolor=#fefefe
| 382752 ||  || — || February 22, 2003 || Palomar || NEAT || ERI || align=right | 2.1 km || 
|-id=753 bgcolor=#d6d6d6
| 382753 ||  || — || March 6, 2003 || Socorro || LINEAR || Tj (2.95) || align=right | 2.6 km || 
|-id=754 bgcolor=#fefefe
| 382754 ||  || — || March 8, 2003 || Kitt Peak || Spacewatch || NYS || align=right data-sort-value="0.72" | 720 m || 
|-id=755 bgcolor=#fefefe
| 382755 ||  || — || March 7, 2003 || Anderson Mesa || LONEOS || — || align=right data-sort-value="0.94" | 940 m || 
|-id=756 bgcolor=#fefefe
| 382756 ||  || — || March 24, 2003 || Kitt Peak || Spacewatch || — || align=right | 1.8 km || 
|-id=757 bgcolor=#E9E9E9
| 382757 ||  || — || March 23, 2003 || Kitt Peak || Spacewatch || — || align=right | 1.1 km || 
|-id=758 bgcolor=#FFC2E0
| 382758 ||  || — || April 5, 2003 || Haleakala || NEAT || APOPHAcritical || align=right data-sort-value="0.32" | 320 m || 
|-id=759 bgcolor=#d6d6d6
| 382759 ||  || — || June 3, 2003 || Catalina || CSS || Tj (2.95) || align=right | 3.8 km || 
|-id=760 bgcolor=#FA8072
| 382760 ||  || — || July 2, 2003 || Socorro || LINEAR || — || align=right | 1.3 km || 
|-id=761 bgcolor=#E9E9E9
| 382761 ||  || — || July 23, 2003 || Palomar || NEAT || DOR || align=right | 2.2 km || 
|-id=762 bgcolor=#E9E9E9
| 382762 ||  || — || July 30, 2003 || Palomar || NEAT || — || align=right | 3.1 km || 
|-id=763 bgcolor=#E9E9E9
| 382763 ||  || — || July 24, 2003 || Palomar || NEAT || CLO || align=right | 2.8 km || 
|-id=764 bgcolor=#E9E9E9
| 382764 ||  || — || August 22, 2003 || Kleť || J. Tichá, M. Tichý || MAR || align=right | 1.5 km || 
|-id=765 bgcolor=#E9E9E9
| 382765 ||  || — || August 21, 2003 || Campo Imperatore || CINEOS || BAR || align=right | 1.8 km || 
|-id=766 bgcolor=#E9E9E9
| 382766 ||  || — || August 31, 2003 || Haleakala || NEAT || — || align=right | 3.2 km || 
|-id=767 bgcolor=#E9E9E9
| 382767 ||  || — || September 14, 2003 || Haleakala || NEAT || DOR || align=right | 2.5 km || 
|-id=768 bgcolor=#E9E9E9
| 382768 ||  || — || September 16, 2003 || Haleakala || NEAT || — || align=right | 3.1 km || 
|-id=769 bgcolor=#E9E9E9
| 382769 ||  || — || September 16, 2003 || Palomar || NEAT || — || align=right | 2.8 km || 
|-id=770 bgcolor=#E9E9E9
| 382770 ||  || — || September 17, 2003 || Palomar || NEAT || — || align=right | 2.7 km || 
|-id=771 bgcolor=#E9E9E9
| 382771 ||  || — || September 16, 2003 || Palomar || NEAT || — || align=right | 2.7 km || 
|-id=772 bgcolor=#E9E9E9
| 382772 ||  || — || September 18, 2003 || Palomar || NEAT || — || align=right | 3.2 km || 
|-id=773 bgcolor=#E9E9E9
| 382773 ||  || — || September 4, 2003 || Socorro || LINEAR || GEF || align=right | 1.5 km || 
|-id=774 bgcolor=#E9E9E9
| 382774 ||  || — || September 19, 2003 || Kitt Peak || Spacewatch || — || align=right | 2.8 km || 
|-id=775 bgcolor=#E9E9E9
| 382775 ||  || — || September 19, 2003 || Palomar || NEAT || — || align=right | 2.6 km || 
|-id=776 bgcolor=#E9E9E9
| 382776 ||  || — || September 20, 2003 || Socorro || LINEAR || — || align=right | 2.4 km || 
|-id=777 bgcolor=#d6d6d6
| 382777 ||  || — || September 20, 2003 || Socorro || LINEAR || — || align=right | 2.9 km || 
|-id=778 bgcolor=#FA8072
| 382778 ||  || — || September 17, 2003 || Anderson Mesa || LONEOS || — || align=right data-sort-value="0.73" | 730 m || 
|-id=779 bgcolor=#E9E9E9
| 382779 ||  || — || September 17, 2003 || Kitt Peak || Spacewatch || — || align=right | 1.5 km || 
|-id=780 bgcolor=#E9E9E9
| 382780 ||  || — || September 21, 2003 || Kitt Peak || Spacewatch || HNA || align=right | 2.5 km || 
|-id=781 bgcolor=#E9E9E9
| 382781 ||  || — || September 27, 2003 || Socorro || LINEAR || — || align=right | 3.4 km || 
|-id=782 bgcolor=#E9E9E9
| 382782 ||  || — || September 29, 2003 || Kitt Peak || Spacewatch || — || align=right | 1.9 km || 
|-id=783 bgcolor=#d6d6d6
| 382783 ||  || — || September 29, 2003 || Socorro || LINEAR || — || align=right | 1.9 km || 
|-id=784 bgcolor=#E9E9E9
| 382784 ||  || — || September 29, 2003 || Anderson Mesa || LONEOS || GEF || align=right | 1.5 km || 
|-id=785 bgcolor=#E9E9E9
| 382785 ||  || — || September 19, 2003 || Kitt Peak || Spacewatch || MRX || align=right data-sort-value="0.93" | 930 m || 
|-id=786 bgcolor=#E9E9E9
| 382786 ||  || — || September 28, 2003 || Apache Point || SDSS || — || align=right | 2.0 km || 
|-id=787 bgcolor=#E9E9E9
| 382787 ||  || — || September 18, 2003 || Kitt Peak || Spacewatch || — || align=right | 1.8 km || 
|-id=788 bgcolor=#E9E9E9
| 382788 ||  || — || September 18, 2003 || Kitt Peak || Spacewatch || — || align=right | 1.8 km || 
|-id=789 bgcolor=#d6d6d6
| 382789 ||  || — || September 19, 2003 || Kitt Peak || Spacewatch || critical || align=right | 1.5 km || 
|-id=790 bgcolor=#E9E9E9
| 382790 ||  || — || September 26, 2003 || Apache Point || SDSS || — || align=right | 1.9 km || 
|-id=791 bgcolor=#E9E9E9
| 382791 ||  || — || September 26, 2003 || Apache Point || SDSS || — || align=right | 2.0 km || 
|-id=792 bgcolor=#E9E9E9
| 382792 ||  || — || September 26, 2003 || Apache Point || SDSS || GEF || align=right | 1.2 km || 
|-id=793 bgcolor=#E9E9E9
| 382793 ||  || — || September 26, 2003 || Apache Point || SDSS || — || align=right | 1.8 km || 
|-id=794 bgcolor=#E9E9E9
| 382794 ||  || — || October 14, 2003 || Palomar || NEAT || — || align=right | 2.6 km || 
|-id=795 bgcolor=#E9E9E9
| 382795 ||  || — || October 14, 2003 || Palomar || NEAT || — || align=right | 3.1 km || 
|-id=796 bgcolor=#E9E9E9
| 382796 ||  || — || October 5, 2003 || Socorro || LINEAR || — || align=right | 3.9 km || 
|-id=797 bgcolor=#E9E9E9
| 382797 ||  || — || October 18, 2003 || Kitt Peak || Spacewatch || HNA || align=right | 2.5 km || 
|-id=798 bgcolor=#E9E9E9
| 382798 ||  || — || October 16, 2003 || Palomar || NEAT || — || align=right | 3.0 km || 
|-id=799 bgcolor=#E9E9E9
| 382799 ||  || — || October 2, 2003 || Socorro || LINEAR || — || align=right | 2.5 km || 
|-id=800 bgcolor=#fefefe
| 382800 ||  || — || October 16, 2003 || Kitt Peak || Spacewatch || FLO || align=right data-sort-value="0.50" | 500 m || 
|}

382801–382900 

|-bgcolor=#fefefe
| 382801 ||  || — || September 21, 2003 || Anderson Mesa || LONEOS || — || align=right data-sort-value="0.75" | 750 m || 
|-id=802 bgcolor=#E9E9E9
| 382802 ||  || — || October 19, 2003 || Palomar || NEAT || — || align=right | 2.6 km || 
|-id=803 bgcolor=#d6d6d6
| 382803 ||  || — || October 21, 2003 || Socorro || LINEAR || BRA || align=right | 2.0 km || 
|-id=804 bgcolor=#fefefe
| 382804 ||  || — || October 21, 2003 || Palomar || NEAT || — || align=right data-sort-value="0.73" | 730 m || 
|-id=805 bgcolor=#fefefe
| 382805 ||  || — || September 29, 2003 || Socorro || LINEAR || — || align=right data-sort-value="0.95" | 950 m || 
|-id=806 bgcolor=#fefefe
| 382806 ||  || — || October 20, 2003 || Kitt Peak || Spacewatch || — || align=right data-sort-value="0.68" | 680 m || 
|-id=807 bgcolor=#E9E9E9
| 382807 ||  || — || October 23, 2003 || Anderson Mesa || LONEOS || GEF || align=right | 1.7 km || 
|-id=808 bgcolor=#E9E9E9
| 382808 ||  || — || October 18, 2003 || Anderson Mesa || LONEOS || INO || align=right | 1.6 km || 
|-id=809 bgcolor=#fefefe
| 382809 ||  || — || October 22, 2003 || Kitt Peak || Spacewatch || — || align=right data-sort-value="0.71" | 710 m || 
|-id=810 bgcolor=#E9E9E9
| 382810 ||  || — || September 22, 2003 || Kitt Peak || Spacewatch || — || align=right | 2.3 km || 
|-id=811 bgcolor=#E9E9E9
| 382811 ||  || — || October 21, 2003 || Socorro || LINEAR || — || align=right | 3.5 km || 
|-id=812 bgcolor=#fefefe
| 382812 ||  || — || October 21, 2003 || Palomar || NEAT || — || align=right data-sort-value="0.65" | 650 m || 
|-id=813 bgcolor=#d6d6d6
| 382813 ||  || — || October 24, 2003 || Socorro || LINEAR || — || align=right | 2.5 km || 
|-id=814 bgcolor=#E9E9E9
| 382814 ||  || — || October 18, 2003 || Apache Point || SDSS || — || align=right | 1.9 km || 
|-id=815 bgcolor=#E9E9E9
| 382815 ||  || — || October 19, 2003 || Apache Point || SDSS || AST || align=right | 1.5 km || 
|-id=816 bgcolor=#E9E9E9
| 382816 ||  || — || October 19, 2003 || Apache Point || SDSS || AGN || align=right | 1.2 km || 
|-id=817 bgcolor=#fefefe
| 382817 ||  || — || October 22, 2003 || Apache Point || SDSS || — || align=right data-sort-value="0.60" | 600 m || 
|-id=818 bgcolor=#fefefe
| 382818 ||  || — || November 15, 2003 || Palomar || NEAT || — || align=right data-sort-value="0.87" | 870 m || 
|-id=819 bgcolor=#d6d6d6
| 382819 ||  || — || November 15, 2003 || Palomar || NEAT || BRA || align=right | 1.9 km || 
|-id=820 bgcolor=#FA8072
| 382820 ||  || — || November 16, 2003 || Kitt Peak || Spacewatch || — || align=right data-sort-value="0.69" | 690 m || 
|-id=821 bgcolor=#E9E9E9
| 382821 ||  || — || November 19, 2003 || Socorro || LINEAR || INO || align=right | 1.5 km || 
|-id=822 bgcolor=#E9E9E9
| 382822 ||  || — || November 18, 2003 || Palomar || NEAT || AGN || align=right | 1.6 km || 
|-id=823 bgcolor=#E9E9E9
| 382823 ||  || — || November 20, 2003 || Socorro || LINEAR || MRX || align=right | 1.3 km || 
|-id=824 bgcolor=#E9E9E9
| 382824 ||  || — || June 29, 2003 || Socorro || LINEAR || — || align=right | 3.2 km || 
|-id=825 bgcolor=#FFC2E0
| 382825 ||  || — || December 15, 2003 || Siding Spring || R. H. McNaught || APOPHA || align=right data-sort-value="0.49" | 490 m || 
|-id=826 bgcolor=#d6d6d6
| 382826 ||  || — || December 1, 2003 || Kitt Peak || Spacewatch || — || align=right | 2.0 km || 
|-id=827 bgcolor=#E9E9E9
| 382827 ||  || — || November 19, 2003 || Kitt Peak || Spacewatch || — || align=right | 2.1 km || 
|-id=828 bgcolor=#d6d6d6
| 382828 ||  || — || December 18, 2003 || Desert Eagle || W. K. Y. Yeung || KOR || align=right | 1.7 km || 
|-id=829 bgcolor=#FA8072
| 382829 ||  || — || December 18, 2003 || Socorro || LINEAR || H || align=right data-sort-value="0.71" | 710 m || 
|-id=830 bgcolor=#d6d6d6
| 382830 ||  || — || December 19, 2003 || Kitt Peak || Spacewatch || — || align=right | 3.6 km || 
|-id=831 bgcolor=#fefefe
| 382831 ||  || — || December 21, 2003 || Kitt Peak || Spacewatch || — || align=right data-sort-value="0.52" | 520 m || 
|-id=832 bgcolor=#d6d6d6
| 382832 ||  || — || December 22, 2003 || Kitt Peak || Spacewatch || — || align=right | 2.9 km || 
|-id=833 bgcolor=#fefefe
| 382833 ||  || — || January 13, 2004 || Palomar || NEAT || — || align=right data-sort-value="0.80" | 800 m || 
|-id=834 bgcolor=#d6d6d6
| 382834 ||  || — || January 15, 2004 || Kitt Peak || Spacewatch || — || align=right | 2.6 km || 
|-id=835 bgcolor=#fefefe
| 382835 ||  || — || January 15, 2004 || Kitt Peak || Spacewatch || — || align=right data-sort-value="0.54" | 540 m || 
|-id=836 bgcolor=#E9E9E9
| 382836 ||  || — || January 18, 2004 || Palomar || NEAT || POS || align=right | 3.5 km || 
|-id=837 bgcolor=#fefefe
| 382837 ||  || — || January 20, 2004 || Socorro || LINEAR || FLO || align=right data-sort-value="0.72" | 720 m || 
|-id=838 bgcolor=#FA8072
| 382838 ||  || — || January 23, 2004 || Socorro || LINEAR || — || align=right data-sort-value="0.87" | 870 m || 
|-id=839 bgcolor=#fefefe
| 382839 ||  || — || January 23, 2004 || Anderson Mesa || LONEOS || — || align=right | 1.3 km || 
|-id=840 bgcolor=#fefefe
| 382840 ||  || — || January 16, 2004 || Kitt Peak || Spacewatch || FLO || align=right data-sort-value="0.66" | 660 m || 
|-id=841 bgcolor=#d6d6d6
| 382841 ||  || — || February 11, 2004 || Kitt Peak || Spacewatch || EOS || align=right | 2.0 km || 
|-id=842 bgcolor=#d6d6d6
| 382842 ||  || — || February 12, 2004 || Kitt Peak || Spacewatch || — || align=right | 3.4 km || 
|-id=843 bgcolor=#fefefe
| 382843 ||  || — || February 14, 2004 || Haleakala || NEAT || — || align=right data-sort-value="0.79" | 790 m || 
|-id=844 bgcolor=#d6d6d6
| 382844 ||  || — || February 11, 2004 || Kitt Peak || Spacewatch || — || align=right | 2.4 km || 
|-id=845 bgcolor=#d6d6d6
| 382845 ||  || — || February 12, 2004 || Palomar || NEAT || — || align=right | 2.5 km || 
|-id=846 bgcolor=#fefefe
| 382846 ||  || — || February 19, 2004 || Socorro || LINEAR || — || align=right data-sort-value="0.88" | 880 m || 
|-id=847 bgcolor=#fefefe
| 382847 ||  || — || February 23, 2004 || Bergisch Gladbac || W. Bickel || — || align=right data-sort-value="0.68" | 680 m || 
|-id=848 bgcolor=#d6d6d6
| 382848 ||  || — || March 12, 2004 || Palomar || NEAT || — || align=right | 4.9 km || 
|-id=849 bgcolor=#d6d6d6
| 382849 ||  || — || March 15, 2004 || Catalina || CSS || — || align=right | 3.7 km || 
|-id=850 bgcolor=#d6d6d6
| 382850 ||  || — || March 15, 2004 || Catalina || CSS || — || align=right | 2.6 km || 
|-id=851 bgcolor=#fefefe
| 382851 ||  || — || March 15, 2004 || Campo Imperatore || CINEOS || — || align=right data-sort-value="0.79" | 790 m || 
|-id=852 bgcolor=#fefefe
| 382852 ||  || — || March 15, 2004 || Socorro || LINEAR || — || align=right data-sort-value="0.73" | 730 m || 
|-id=853 bgcolor=#fefefe
| 382853 ||  || — || March 14, 2004 || Kitt Peak || Spacewatch || FLO || align=right data-sort-value="0.68" | 680 m || 
|-id=854 bgcolor=#d6d6d6
| 382854 ||  || — || March 15, 2004 || Socorro || LINEAR || — || align=right | 3.5 km || 
|-id=855 bgcolor=#fefefe
| 382855 ||  || — || March 15, 2004 || Palomar || NEAT || PHO || align=right | 1.1 km || 
|-id=856 bgcolor=#d6d6d6
| 382856 ||  || — || March 18, 2004 || Socorro || LINEAR || — || align=right | 3.0 km || 
|-id=857 bgcolor=#fefefe
| 382857 ||  || — || March 28, 2004 || Socorro || LINEAR || H || align=right data-sort-value="0.83" | 830 m || 
|-id=858 bgcolor=#fefefe
| 382858 ||  || — || February 13, 2004 || Kitt Peak || Spacewatch || — || align=right | 1.1 km || 
|-id=859 bgcolor=#fefefe
| 382859 ||  || — || March 17, 2004 || Kitt Peak || Spacewatch || — || align=right data-sort-value="0.74" | 740 m || 
|-id=860 bgcolor=#fefefe
| 382860 ||  || — || March 18, 2004 || Socorro || LINEAR || — || align=right data-sort-value="0.88" | 880 m || 
|-id=861 bgcolor=#d6d6d6
| 382861 ||  || — || March 23, 2004 || Socorro || LINEAR || — || align=right | 3.1 km || 
|-id=862 bgcolor=#fefefe
| 382862 ||  || — || March 23, 2004 || Socorro || LINEAR || — || align=right data-sort-value="0.95" | 950 m || 
|-id=863 bgcolor=#fefefe
| 382863 ||  || — || March 24, 2004 || Anderson Mesa || LONEOS || — || align=right data-sort-value="0.92" | 920 m || 
|-id=864 bgcolor=#fefefe
| 382864 ||  || — || March 27, 2004 || Socorro || LINEAR || — || align=right data-sort-value="0.83" | 830 m || 
|-id=865 bgcolor=#d6d6d6
| 382865 ||  || — || March 27, 2004 || Socorro || LINEAR || — || align=right | 1.9 km || 
|-id=866 bgcolor=#d6d6d6
| 382866 ||  || — || March 17, 2004 || Kitt Peak || Spacewatch || — || align=right | 3.3 km || 
|-id=867 bgcolor=#d6d6d6
| 382867 ||  || — || March 16, 2004 || Siding Spring || SSS || — || align=right | 4.5 km || 
|-id=868 bgcolor=#fefefe
| 382868 ||  || — || April 13, 2004 || Catalina || CSS || — || align=right | 1.1 km || 
|-id=869 bgcolor=#d6d6d6
| 382869 ||  || — || April 13, 2004 || Kitt Peak || Spacewatch || — || align=right | 3.0 km || 
|-id=870 bgcolor=#d6d6d6
| 382870 ||  || — || April 19, 2004 || Socorro || LINEAR || — || align=right | 3.5 km || 
|-id=871 bgcolor=#d6d6d6
| 382871 ||  || — || April 21, 2004 || Socorro || LINEAR || — || align=right | 2.5 km || 
|-id=872 bgcolor=#fefefe
| 382872 ||  || — || April 24, 2004 || Kitt Peak || Spacewatch || H || align=right data-sort-value="0.43" | 430 m || 
|-id=873 bgcolor=#d6d6d6
| 382873 ||  || — || May 13, 2004 || Kitt Peak || Spacewatch || — || align=right | 3.2 km || 
|-id=874 bgcolor=#d6d6d6
| 382874 ||  || — || May 14, 2004 || Socorro || LINEAR || — || align=right | 3.4 km || 
|-id=875 bgcolor=#FFC2E0
| 382875 ||  || — || May 19, 2004 || Kitt Peak || Spacewatch || AMO || align=right data-sort-value="0.17" | 170 m || 
|-id=876 bgcolor=#d6d6d6
| 382876 ||  || — || May 19, 2004 || Kitt Peak || Spacewatch || — || align=right | 2.8 km || 
|-id=877 bgcolor=#fefefe
| 382877 ||  || — || June 7, 2004 || Palomar || NEAT || H || align=right data-sort-value="0.91" | 910 m || 
|-id=878 bgcolor=#fefefe
| 382878 ||  || — || May 23, 2004 || Socorro || LINEAR || — || align=right | 1.0 km || 
|-id=879 bgcolor=#E9E9E9
| 382879 ||  || — || June 13, 2004 || Palomar || NEAT || — || align=right | 2.2 km || 
|-id=880 bgcolor=#E9E9E9
| 382880 ||  || — || June 13, 2004 || Palomar || NEAT || — || align=right | 1.5 km || 
|-id=881 bgcolor=#E9E9E9
| 382881 ||  || — || June 12, 2004 || Siding Spring || SSS || — || align=right | 1.8 km || 
|-id=882 bgcolor=#fefefe
| 382882 ||  || — || June 12, 2004 || Socorro || LINEAR || H || align=right data-sort-value="0.67" | 670 m || 
|-id=883 bgcolor=#E9E9E9
| 382883 ||  || — || June 16, 2004 || Kitt Peak || Spacewatch || — || align=right | 1.4 km || 
|-id=884 bgcolor=#E9E9E9
| 382884 ||  || — || July 11, 2004 || Socorro || LINEAR || — || align=right | 3.3 km || 
|-id=885 bgcolor=#fefefe
| 382885 ||  || — || July 11, 2004 || Socorro || LINEAR || — || align=right | 1.1 km || 
|-id=886 bgcolor=#fefefe
| 382886 ||  || — || August 9, 2004 || Anderson Mesa || LONEOS || H || align=right data-sort-value="0.65" | 650 m || 
|-id=887 bgcolor=#E9E9E9
| 382887 ||  || — || August 8, 2004 || Reedy Creek || J. Broughton || — || align=right | 1.1 km || 
|-id=888 bgcolor=#E9E9E9
| 382888 ||  || — || August 9, 2004 || Socorro || LINEAR || — || align=right | 1.7 km || 
|-id=889 bgcolor=#E9E9E9
| 382889 ||  || — || August 8, 2004 || Anderson Mesa || LONEOS || — || align=right | 1.7 km || 
|-id=890 bgcolor=#E9E9E9
| 382890 ||  || — || August 8, 2004 || Anderson Mesa || LONEOS || IAN || align=right data-sort-value="0.92" | 920 m || 
|-id=891 bgcolor=#fefefe
| 382891 ||  || — || August 10, 2004 || Socorro || LINEAR || — || align=right data-sort-value="0.96" | 960 m || 
|-id=892 bgcolor=#E9E9E9
| 382892 ||  || — || August 10, 2004 || Socorro || LINEAR || — || align=right | 2.9 km || 
|-id=893 bgcolor=#FA8072
| 382893 ||  || — || August 11, 2004 || Socorro || LINEAR || — || align=right | 2.3 km || 
|-id=894 bgcolor=#E9E9E9
| 382894 ||  || — || August 12, 2004 || Palomar || NEAT || — || align=right | 2.0 km || 
|-id=895 bgcolor=#E9E9E9
| 382895 ||  || — || August 21, 2004 || Siding Spring || SSS || — || align=right data-sort-value="0.98" | 980 m || 
|-id=896 bgcolor=#E9E9E9
| 382896 ||  || — || August 25, 2004 || Socorro || LINEAR || — || align=right | 3.6 km || 
|-id=897 bgcolor=#E9E9E9
| 382897 ||  || — || August 21, 2004 || Catalina || CSS || — || align=right | 2.0 km || 
|-id=898 bgcolor=#E9E9E9
| 382898 ||  || — || August 23, 2004 || Siding Spring || SSS || EUN || align=right | 1.5 km || 
|-id=899 bgcolor=#E9E9E9
| 382899 ||  || — || August 23, 2004 || Siding Spring || SSS || — || align=right | 1.4 km || 
|-id=900 bgcolor=#E9E9E9
| 382900 Rendelmann ||  ||  || September 6, 2004 || Altschwendt || W. Ries || — || align=right | 1.6 km || 
|}

382901–383000 

|-bgcolor=#E9E9E9
| 382901 ||  || — || September 8, 2004 || Socorro || LINEAR || MIS || align=right | 2.5 km || 
|-id=902 bgcolor=#E9E9E9
| 382902 ||  || — || September 8, 2004 || Socorro || LINEAR || — || align=right | 1.3 km || 
|-id=903 bgcolor=#E9E9E9
| 382903 ||  || — || September 8, 2004 || Socorro || LINEAR || — || align=right | 1.2 km || 
|-id=904 bgcolor=#E9E9E9
| 382904 ||  || — || September 8, 2004 || Socorro || LINEAR || — || align=right data-sort-value="0.91" | 910 m || 
|-id=905 bgcolor=#E9E9E9
| 382905 ||  || — || September 8, 2004 || Palomar || NEAT || EUN || align=right | 1.3 km || 
|-id=906 bgcolor=#E9E9E9
| 382906 ||  || — || September 7, 2004 || Kitt Peak || Spacewatch || — || align=right data-sort-value="0.92" | 920 m || 
|-id=907 bgcolor=#E9E9E9
| 382907 ||  || — || September 8, 2004 || Socorro || LINEAR || — || align=right | 1.5 km || 
|-id=908 bgcolor=#E9E9E9
| 382908 ||  || — || September 10, 2004 || Socorro || LINEAR || — || align=right | 1.6 km || 
|-id=909 bgcolor=#E9E9E9
| 382909 ||  || — || September 8, 2004 || Socorro || LINEAR || RAF || align=right data-sort-value="0.91" | 910 m || 
|-id=910 bgcolor=#E9E9E9
| 382910 ||  || — || August 19, 2004 || Socorro || LINEAR || — || align=right | 2.4 km || 
|-id=911 bgcolor=#E9E9E9
| 382911 ||  || — || September 10, 2004 || Socorro || LINEAR || IAN || align=right data-sort-value="0.92" | 920 m || 
|-id=912 bgcolor=#E9E9E9
| 382912 ||  || — || September 10, 2004 || Socorro || LINEAR || — || align=right | 1.7 km || 
|-id=913 bgcolor=#E9E9E9
| 382913 ||  || — || September 10, 2004 || Socorro || LINEAR || — || align=right | 1.3 km || 
|-id=914 bgcolor=#E9E9E9
| 382914 ||  || — || September 10, 2004 || Socorro || LINEAR || IAN || align=right | 1.1 km || 
|-id=915 bgcolor=#E9E9E9
| 382915 ||  || — || September 10, 2004 || Socorro || LINEAR || EUN || align=right | 1.6 km || 
|-id=916 bgcolor=#E9E9E9
| 382916 ||  || — || September 11, 2004 || Socorro || LINEAR || — || align=right | 2.1 km || 
|-id=917 bgcolor=#E9E9E9
| 382917 ||  || — || September 11, 2004 || Socorro || LINEAR || — || align=right | 2.3 km || 
|-id=918 bgcolor=#E9E9E9
| 382918 ||  || — || September 11, 2004 || Socorro || LINEAR || — || align=right | 1.9 km || 
|-id=919 bgcolor=#fefefe
| 382919 ||  || — || September 10, 2004 || Kitt Peak || Spacewatch || — || align=right | 1.1 km || 
|-id=920 bgcolor=#E9E9E9
| 382920 ||  || — || September 12, 2004 || Kitt Peak || Spacewatch || RAF || align=right data-sort-value="0.82" | 820 m || 
|-id=921 bgcolor=#E9E9E9
| 382921 ||  || — || September 6, 2004 || Palomar || NEAT || ADE || align=right | 2.8 km || 
|-id=922 bgcolor=#E9E9E9
| 382922 ||  || — || September 13, 2004 || Socorro || LINEAR || JUN || align=right data-sort-value="0.89" | 890 m || 
|-id=923 bgcolor=#E9E9E9
| 382923 ||  || — || August 20, 2004 || Catalina || CSS || — || align=right | 1.2 km || 
|-id=924 bgcolor=#E9E9E9
| 382924 ||  || — || September 11, 2004 || Socorro || LINEAR || MAR || align=right | 1.3 km || 
|-id=925 bgcolor=#E9E9E9
| 382925 ||  || — || September 18, 2004 || Socorro || LINEAR || — || align=right | 1.4 km || 
|-id=926 bgcolor=#E9E9E9
| 382926 ||  || — || September 22, 2004 || Socorro || LINEAR || — || align=right | 1.5 km || 
|-id=927 bgcolor=#E9E9E9
| 382927 ||  || — || October 8, 2004 || Socorro || LINEAR || HNS || align=right | 1.5 km || 
|-id=928 bgcolor=#E9E9E9
| 382928 ||  || — || October 5, 2004 || Kitt Peak || Spacewatch || MIS || align=right | 2.8 km || 
|-id=929 bgcolor=#E9E9E9
| 382929 ||  || — || October 5, 2004 || Kitt Peak || Spacewatch || EUN || align=right | 1.4 km || 
|-id=930 bgcolor=#E9E9E9
| 382930 ||  || — || October 5, 2004 || Anderson Mesa || LONEOS || — || align=right | 1.7 km || 
|-id=931 bgcolor=#E9E9E9
| 382931 ||  || — || October 4, 2004 || Socorro || LINEAR || EUN || align=right | 2.0 km || 
|-id=932 bgcolor=#E9E9E9
| 382932 ||  || — || October 5, 2004 || Kitt Peak || Spacewatch || MAR || align=right | 1.3 km || 
|-id=933 bgcolor=#E9E9E9
| 382933 ||  || — || September 14, 2004 || Socorro || LINEAR || — || align=right | 1.3 km || 
|-id=934 bgcolor=#E9E9E9
| 382934 ||  || — || October 4, 2004 || Kitt Peak || Spacewatch || — || align=right | 1.5 km || 
|-id=935 bgcolor=#d6d6d6
| 382935 ||  || — || October 6, 2004 || Kitt Peak || Spacewatch || HIL3:2 || align=right | 5.5 km || 
|-id=936 bgcolor=#E9E9E9
| 382936 ||  || — || October 6, 2004 || Kitt Peak || Spacewatch || — || align=right | 1.2 km || 
|-id=937 bgcolor=#E9E9E9
| 382937 ||  || — || October 9, 2004 || Socorro || LINEAR || — || align=right | 1.8 km || 
|-id=938 bgcolor=#E9E9E9
| 382938 ||  || — || October 7, 2004 || Kitt Peak || Spacewatch || IAN || align=right | 1.0 km || 
|-id=939 bgcolor=#E9E9E9
| 382939 ||  || — || October 10, 2004 || Socorro || LINEAR || — || align=right | 2.2 km || 
|-id=940 bgcolor=#E9E9E9
| 382940 ||  || — || October 10, 2004 || Socorro || LINEAR || — || align=right | 1.9 km || 
|-id=941 bgcolor=#E9E9E9
| 382941 ||  || — || October 9, 2004 || Kitt Peak || Spacewatch || — || align=right | 1.4 km || 
|-id=942 bgcolor=#E9E9E9
| 382942 ||  || — || October 9, 2004 || Socorro || LINEAR || — || align=right | 1.9 km || 
|-id=943 bgcolor=#E9E9E9
| 382943 ||  || — || September 18, 2004 || Socorro || LINEAR || — || align=right | 1.4 km || 
|-id=944 bgcolor=#E9E9E9
| 382944 ||  || — || October 11, 2004 || Kitt Peak || Spacewatch || — || align=right | 2.0 km || 
|-id=945 bgcolor=#E9E9E9
| 382945 ||  || — || October 9, 2004 || Kitt Peak || Spacewatch || — || align=right | 1.00 km || 
|-id=946 bgcolor=#E9E9E9
| 382946 ||  || — || October 10, 2004 || Kitt Peak || Spacewatch || — || align=right | 1.6 km || 
|-id=947 bgcolor=#E9E9E9
| 382947 ||  || — || October 14, 2004 || Kitt Peak || Spacewatch || — || align=right | 1.5 km || 
|-id=948 bgcolor=#E9E9E9
| 382948 ||  || — || October 6, 2004 || Kitt Peak || Spacewatch || — || align=right | 1.6 km || 
|-id=949 bgcolor=#E9E9E9
| 382949 ||  || — || October 18, 2004 || Socorro || LINEAR || — || align=right | 1.7 km || 
|-id=950 bgcolor=#E9E9E9
| 382950 ||  || — || November 3, 2004 || Catalina || CSS || — || align=right | 1.9 km || 
|-id=951 bgcolor=#E9E9E9
| 382951 ||  || — || November 3, 2004 || Catalina || CSS || JUN || align=right | 1.3 km || 
|-id=952 bgcolor=#E9E9E9
| 382952 ||  || — || November 3, 2004 || Palomar || NEAT || JUN || align=right | 1.3 km || 
|-id=953 bgcolor=#E9E9E9
| 382953 ||  || — || November 4, 2004 || Needville || Needville Obs. || — || align=right | 1.3 km || 
|-id=954 bgcolor=#E9E9E9
| 382954 ||  || — || November 4, 2004 || Anderson Mesa || LONEOS || — || align=right | 2.0 km || 
|-id=955 bgcolor=#E9E9E9
| 382955 ||  || — || November 3, 2004 || Kitt Peak || Spacewatch || — || align=right | 1.4 km || 
|-id=956 bgcolor=#E9E9E9
| 382956 ||  || — || November 12, 2004 || Catalina || CSS || — || align=right | 1.5 km || 
|-id=957 bgcolor=#E9E9E9
| 382957 ||  || — || November 11, 2004 || Kitt Peak || Spacewatch || — || align=right | 2.1 km || 
|-id=958 bgcolor=#E9E9E9
| 382958 ||  || — || November 9, 2004 || Catalina || CSS || — || align=right | 1.2 km || 
|-id=959 bgcolor=#E9E9E9
| 382959 ||  || — || December 3, 2004 || Kitt Peak || Spacewatch || HNS || align=right | 1.7 km || 
|-id=960 bgcolor=#E9E9E9
| 382960 ||  || — || December 8, 2004 || Socorro || LINEAR || — || align=right | 2.1 km || 
|-id=961 bgcolor=#E9E9E9
| 382961 ||  || — || December 9, 2004 || Socorro || LINEAR || — || align=right | 3.3 km || 
|-id=962 bgcolor=#E9E9E9
| 382962 ||  || — || December 10, 2004 || Socorro || LINEAR || — || align=right | 2.9 km || 
|-id=963 bgcolor=#E9E9E9
| 382963 ||  || — || December 2, 2004 || Catalina || CSS || JUN || align=right | 1.7 km || 
|-id=964 bgcolor=#E9E9E9
| 382964 ||  || — || December 10, 2004 || Kitt Peak || Spacewatch || MRX || align=right | 1.4 km || 
|-id=965 bgcolor=#E9E9E9
| 382965 ||  || — || December 11, 2004 || Socorro || LINEAR || — || align=right | 1.9 km || 
|-id=966 bgcolor=#E9E9E9
| 382966 ||  || — || December 11, 2004 || Kitt Peak || Spacewatch || — || align=right | 2.2 km || 
|-id=967 bgcolor=#E9E9E9
| 382967 ||  || — || December 14, 2004 || Socorro || LINEAR || — || align=right | 1.7 km || 
|-id=968 bgcolor=#E9E9E9
| 382968 ||  || — || December 9, 2004 || Vail-Jarnac || Jarnac Obs. || — || align=right | 1.5 km || 
|-id=969 bgcolor=#E9E9E9
| 382969 ||  || — || December 15, 2004 || Kitt Peak || Spacewatch || MRX || align=right | 1.3 km || 
|-id=970 bgcolor=#E9E9E9
| 382970 ||  || — || December 15, 2004 || Socorro || LINEAR || — || align=right | 3.2 km || 
|-id=971 bgcolor=#E9E9E9
| 382971 ||  || — || January 6, 2005 || Socorro || LINEAR || — || align=right | 3.9 km || 
|-id=972 bgcolor=#E9E9E9
| 382972 ||  || — || January 12, 2005 || Socorro || LINEAR || — || align=right | 2.7 km || 
|-id=973 bgcolor=#E9E9E9
| 382973 ||  || — || December 20, 2004 || Mount Lemmon || Mount Lemmon Survey || GEF || align=right | 1.5 km || 
|-id=974 bgcolor=#E9E9E9
| 382974 ||  || — || January 15, 2005 || Socorro || LINEAR || — || align=right | 2.7 km || 
|-id=975 bgcolor=#E9E9E9
| 382975 ||  || — || January 15, 2005 || Socorro || LINEAR || MRX || align=right | 1.1 km || 
|-id=976 bgcolor=#E9E9E9
| 382976 ||  || — || January 15, 2005 || Kitt Peak || Spacewatch || — || align=right | 2.9 km || 
|-id=977 bgcolor=#E9E9E9
| 382977 ||  || — || January 15, 2005 || Kitt Peak || Spacewatch || — || align=right | 2.4 km || 
|-id=978 bgcolor=#E9E9E9
| 382978 ||  || — || January 18, 2005 || Sandlot || G. Hug || JUN || align=right | 1.6 km || 
|-id=979 bgcolor=#E9E9E9
| 382979 ||  || — || January 20, 2005 || Wrightwood || J. W. Young || — || align=right | 2.1 km || 
|-id=980 bgcolor=#E9E9E9
| 382980 ||  || — || January 16, 2005 || Mauna Kea || C. Veillet || AGN || align=right | 1.2 km || 
|-id=981 bgcolor=#E9E9E9
| 382981 ||  || — || February 1, 2005 || Palomar || NEAT || — || align=right | 4.7 km || 
|-id=982 bgcolor=#E9E9E9
| 382982 ||  || — || February 2, 2005 || Socorro || LINEAR || — || align=right | 2.2 km || 
|-id=983 bgcolor=#E9E9E9
| 382983 ||  || — || February 2, 2005 || Catalina || CSS || JUN || align=right | 1.2 km || 
|-id=984 bgcolor=#E9E9E9
| 382984 ||  || — || February 3, 2005 || Socorro || LINEAR || — || align=right | 2.1 km || 
|-id=985 bgcolor=#E9E9E9
| 382985 ||  || — || February 1, 2005 || Kitt Peak || Spacewatch || GAL || align=right | 1.7 km || 
|-id=986 bgcolor=#E9E9E9
| 382986 ||  || — || February 4, 2005 || Mayhill || A. Lowe || — || align=right | 2.8 km || 
|-id=987 bgcolor=#E9E9E9
| 382987 ||  || — || March 2, 2005 || Kitt Peak || Spacewatch || — || align=right | 2.1 km || 
|-id=988 bgcolor=#E9E9E9
| 382988 ||  || — || March 2, 2005 || Kitt Peak || Spacewatch || — || align=right | 2.7 km || 
|-id=989 bgcolor=#E9E9E9
| 382989 ||  || — || March 3, 2005 || Catalina || CSS || — || align=right | 2.4 km || 
|-id=990 bgcolor=#E9E9E9
| 382990 ||  || — || March 3, 2005 || Kitt Peak || Spacewatch || XIZ || align=right | 1.5 km || 
|-id=991 bgcolor=#E9E9E9
| 382991 ||  || — || March 8, 2005 || Anderson Mesa || LONEOS || — || align=right | 2.3 km || 
|-id=992 bgcolor=#d6d6d6
| 382992 ||  || — || March 9, 2005 || Mount Lemmon || Mount Lemmon Survey || — || align=right | 2.4 km || 
|-id=993 bgcolor=#E9E9E9
| 382993 ||  || — || March 11, 2005 || Mount Lemmon || Mount Lemmon Survey || — || align=right | 1.4 km || 
|-id=994 bgcolor=#E9E9E9
| 382994 ||  || — || March 10, 2005 || Catalina || CSS || — || align=right | 3.1 km || 
|-id=995 bgcolor=#E9E9E9
| 382995 ||  || — || April 1, 2005 || Kitt Peak || Spacewatch || — || align=right | 2.3 km || 
|-id=996 bgcolor=#fefefe
| 382996 ||  || — || April 5, 2005 || Anderson Mesa || LONEOS || — || align=right data-sort-value="0.81" | 810 m || 
|-id=997 bgcolor=#fefefe
| 382997 ||  || — || April 28, 2005 || Mayhill || A. Lowe || — || align=right data-sort-value="0.84" | 840 m || 
|-id=998 bgcolor=#d6d6d6
| 382998 ||  || — || May 4, 2005 || Kitt Peak || Spacewatch || — || align=right | 2.8 km || 
|-id=999 bgcolor=#d6d6d6
| 382999 ||  || — || May 4, 2005 || Catalina || CSS || — || align=right | 4.6 km || 
|-id=000 bgcolor=#d6d6d6
| 383000 ||  || — || May 12, 2005 || Mount Lemmon || Mount Lemmon Survey || — || align=right | 3.6 km || 
|}

References

External links 
 Discovery Circumstances: Numbered Minor Planets (380001)–(385000) (IAU Minor Planet Center)

0382